= Hiromichi Mizuno =

Japanese financial executive (born 1965)

Hiro Mizuno
- 水野 弘道
- Born: Tajimi, Gifu Prefecture, Japan
- Education: Osaka City University (BA); Northwestern University (MBA)
- Occupation: Financial executive

Hiromichi Mizuno (水野 弘道) is a financial executive who served as chief investment officer of the Japan Government Pension Investment Fund (GPIF), the largest asset owner in the world, from January 2015 until March 2020. He is currently United Nations special envoy on innovative finance and sustainable investments.

== Early life and education ==
Mizuno was born in Tajimi in Gifu Prefecture, Japan. He received his BA of law at the Osaka City University, before gaining a Master of Business Administration at the Kellogg School of Management of Northwestern University.

== Career ==
Earlier in his career, Mizuno worked for Sumitomo Mitsui Trust Holdings from April 1988 to January 2003. He then became a partner of Coller Capital from 2003 until January 2015.

Mizuno then became executive managing director and CIO of the Government Pension Investment Fund of Japan (GPIF), the largest pension fund globally with AUM of $1.5 trillion.

Mizuno is currently a director of the United Nations Principles for Responsible Investment Association. On 30 December 2020, he was appointed by United Nations Secretary-General António Guterres as United Nations special envoy on innovative finance and sustainable investments.

In 2019, the Financial Times reported that through his role with the GPIF as chief investment officer, "here are not many people who have caused as many waves in the global environmental, social and governance landscape in 2019 [as Mizuno]." It reported that under Mizuno, the GPIF had "embraced" ESG principles.

After joining the board of Tesla in 2020, he was no longer on the board as of 2025.

He was named a special advisor to the CEO of MSCI on August 1, 2023.

In February 2025, the Financial Times reported that he was leading a "high level Japanese group" including ex-prime minister Yoshihide Suga and Hiroto Izumi, which proposed bringing in a consortium of investors to invest in Nissan. In February 2025, he denied the report's assertion that he was aiming for the group persuade Tesla to invest in Nissan Motor co, and also denied having any membership in the group.

== Other activities ==
=== Corporate boards ===
- Tesla, Inc., Independent Member of the Board of Directors (since 2020) - former
- Danone, Member of the Mission Committee (since 2020)

=== Non-profit organizations ===
- The B Team, Member
- CFA Institute, Member of the Future of Finance Advisory Council
- Global Business Coalition for Education, Member of the Advisory Board

== Controversy ==
In September 2020, the Financial Times reported that Mizuno had intervened personally to influence the Harvard University endowment fund – one of Toshiba's largest investors – in what it described as "campaign" to ensure the reappointment of Nobuaki Kurumatani as Toshiba chief executive against the opposition of activist shareholders.
