= The B Team =

Nonprofit organization

- Formation: October 2012
- Type: 501(c)(3) organization
- Tax ID no.: 46-1860634
- Location: 65 Bleecker Street, 6th Floor, New York, NY, NY 10012, USA
- Founders: Sir Richard Branson and Jochen Zeitz
- Key people: Jesper Brodin (Chair) Ester Baiget (Vice-Chair) Leah Seligmann (CEO)
- Website: www.bteam.org

The B Team is a global nonprofit initiative co-founded by Sir Richard Branson and Jochen Zeitz. It advocates for business practices that are more centered on humanity and the climate.

== History ==
In 2013, a group of executives held a series of workshops that included civil society leaders, systems experts, sustainability pioneers, economists and entrepreneurs. Inspired by the work of Lester Brown and the B Corporation movement, they labeled their vision for better business as 'Plan B,' and 'The B Team' emerged. The B Team executives intend to work "challenges" into their own companies to lessen dependence on 'Plan A', or business as usual.

The B Team was incubated by Virgin Unite, the charitable arm of the Virgin Group, which had previously incubated such organizations the Elders and the Carbon War Room. In October 2012, Branson and Zeitz announced the formation of The B Team. Its first CEO was Derek Handley, co-founder of The Hyperfactory. It has since grown to include over 32 leaders and is currently chaired by Jesper Brodin, CEO of Ingka Group (IKEA).

Leah Seligmann was appointed Chief Change Catalyst and CEO of The B Team in October 2024. This followed the departure of The B Team's long-serving CEO, Halla Tomasdottir, who campaigned for and won the 2024 Icelandic Presidential Election.

=== Leaders ===
The founding B Team leaders include: Sir Richard Branson, Founder of the Virgin Group and Co-Founder and Co-Chair of the B Team, Kathy Calvin, President and CEO of the United Nations Foundation, Dr. Gro Harlem Brundtland, Deputy Chair of The Elders, Christiana Figueres, Convener of Mission 2020, Mats Granryd, Director General of GSMA, Arianna Huffington, Founder and CEO of Thrive Global, Mo Ibrahim, Founder of Celtel, Guilherme Leal, Founder and Co-Chairman of Natura, Strive Masiyiwa, Founder and Chairman of Econet Wireless, Dr. Ngozi Okonjo-Iweala, Coordinating Minister of the Economy and Minister of Finance of Nigeria, François-Henri Pinault, CEO and Chairman of Kering, Paul Polman, CEO of Unilever, Mary Robinson, Chair of The Elders and President of the Mary Robinson Foundation for Climate Justice, Ratan Tata, Chairman Emeritus of the Tata Group, Zhang Yue, Chairman and Founder of Broad Group China, Professor Muhammad Yunus, Chairman of Yunus Centre, Jochen Zeitz, Founder of The Zeitz Foundation, Co-Founder and Co-Chair of The B Team. In 2015, Marc Benioff, Founder, Chairman and CEO of Salesforce.com, Sharan Burrow, General Secretary of the International Trade Union Confederation, Bob Collymore, CEO of Safaricom and David Crane, ex-CEO of NRG joined as B Team Leaders. In July, 2016 Oliver Bäte, CEO of Allianz Group, Andrew Liveris, Chairman and CEO of Dow Chemical Company and Arif Naqvi, Founder and Group CEO of Abraaj Group joined as B Team Leaders.

In 2018, Emmanuel Faber, Chairman and Chief Executive Officer of Danone, Indra Nooyi, Chairman and Former CEO of PepsiCo, Isabelle Kocher, CEO of Engie, and Hamdi Ulukaya, Founder, Chairman and CEO of Chobani joined The B Team. In 2020, The B Team welcomed Hiro Mizuno, CIO of Japan’s Government Pension Investment Fund (GPIF), Torben Möger Pedersen, CEO of PensionDanmark, Jesper Brodin, CEO of Ingka Group, and Jean Oelwang, Founding CEO and President of Virgin Unite to the group.

In 2021, Ester Baiget, President and CEO of Novozymes, Ilham Kadri, CEO and President of Solvay, Joseph Kenner, President and CEO of Greyston, and Van Jones, a CNN contributor and founder of the Dream Corps joined as B Team Leaders. In 2023, Jacqueline Novogratz, founder and CEO of Acumen, and Juan Carlos Mora, CEO of Bancolombia joined as B Team Leaders. In 2024, Ryan Gellert, CEO of Patagonia, Jessica Sibley, CEO of TIME and José Manuel Entrecanales, Chairman and CEO of ACCIONA joined The B Team. In 2026, Jennifer Morris, CEO of The Nature Conservancy and Alex Taylor, Chairman and CEO of Cox Enterprises joined The B Team.

== Work and Collective Action ==
In 2015 The B Team leaders advocated for a climate agreement at the COP21 meeting. They supported a long-term goal to limit global temperature rise to 1.5 degrees, to preserve oceans and save low-lying island nations from rising sea levels. Ten companies associated with The B Team set aspirations for their own organisations to reach net zero greenhouse gas emissions by 2050, including the French apparel and accessories group Kering; the US electricity company NRG Energy; the Kenyan mobile network operator Safaricom; the global enterprise cloud computing company Salesforce.com; the internationally renowned jeweler Tiffany & Co; the Chinese construction company BROAD Group, the African telecommunications group Econet, the Brazilian cosmetics manufacturer Natura, the consumer goods company Unilever, and the international investment group Virgin Management. The B Team leaders called on governments around the world to adopt Net-Zero by 2050 as a long-term goal in the COP21 agreement. The B Team worked as part of the We Mean Business Coalition, alongside partners like Ceres and the World Business Council for Sustainable Development, to drive bold climate action by business in 2015.

In 2014 The B Team, along with Unilever, Natura, Transparency International, Global Witness, Global Financial Integrity and OpenCorporates formed a working group to support and increase the number of companies implementing beneficial ownership transparency and worked to articulate a business case for doing so. B Team leader's advocated to the Extractive Industries Transparency Initiative board in favour of adopting a beneficial ownership transparency standard for its 51 members, which they did in March 2016. Following the release of the Panama Papers in April 2016 The B Team announced, along with its partners Global Witness, ONE, Open Contracting Partnership, OpenCorporates, The Web Foundation, and Transparency International, the creation of a Global Beneficial Ownership Register for businesses to share their company structures, and eliminate the use of shell companies like those used to obfuscate the owners of assets in the Panama Papers.

In 2015 The B Team launched the 100% Human at Work initiative and network as they believed it was "time for businesses to stop looking at people as resources and to start seeing them as human beings". The B Team have built the People Innovation Network, to bring companies together to share and learn from one another about how to help their employees thrive at work.

Working as part of the Natural Capital Coalition The B Team supported the development of the first global, standard Natural Capital Protocol - a set of tools for companies to measure their impacts and dependencies on nature. The protocol was launched July 2016, following pilots by more than 40 companies, including Kering and Dow Chemical. Kering Group also published its pioneering group-wide environmental profit and loss accounts in 2015.

In 2016, as part of their work for The B Team Sir Richard Branson and Marc Benioff launched a movement of entrepreneurs and business leaders building their companies with people and planet alongside profit as part of their DNA from the outset, called "Born B'".

In 2017 The B Team launched The B Team Africa, its first regional B Team. Its initial leadership included Bob Collymore, Dr. Ngozi Okonjo-Iweala, Dr. Mo Ibrahim, and Jochen Zeitz. Subsequently, it added The B Team Australia Network as a regional team.

In 2018, The B Team partnered with Ceres to launch 'Getting Climate Smart - A Primer for Corporate Directors in a Changing Environment'. The project sought to make corporate directors aware that climate change is a board-relevant issue and teach them how to manage the risks and opportunities related to climate. Sponsoring the project was the Ikea Foundation and the We Mean Business Coalition.

In 2021, The B Team launched The New Leadership Playbook, a collection of stories, insights and resources on 21st-century business leadership. This included 10x Bolder, a conversation-based podcast series exploring how leaders align values with influence.
