= Jessica Sibley =

American business executive (born 1969)

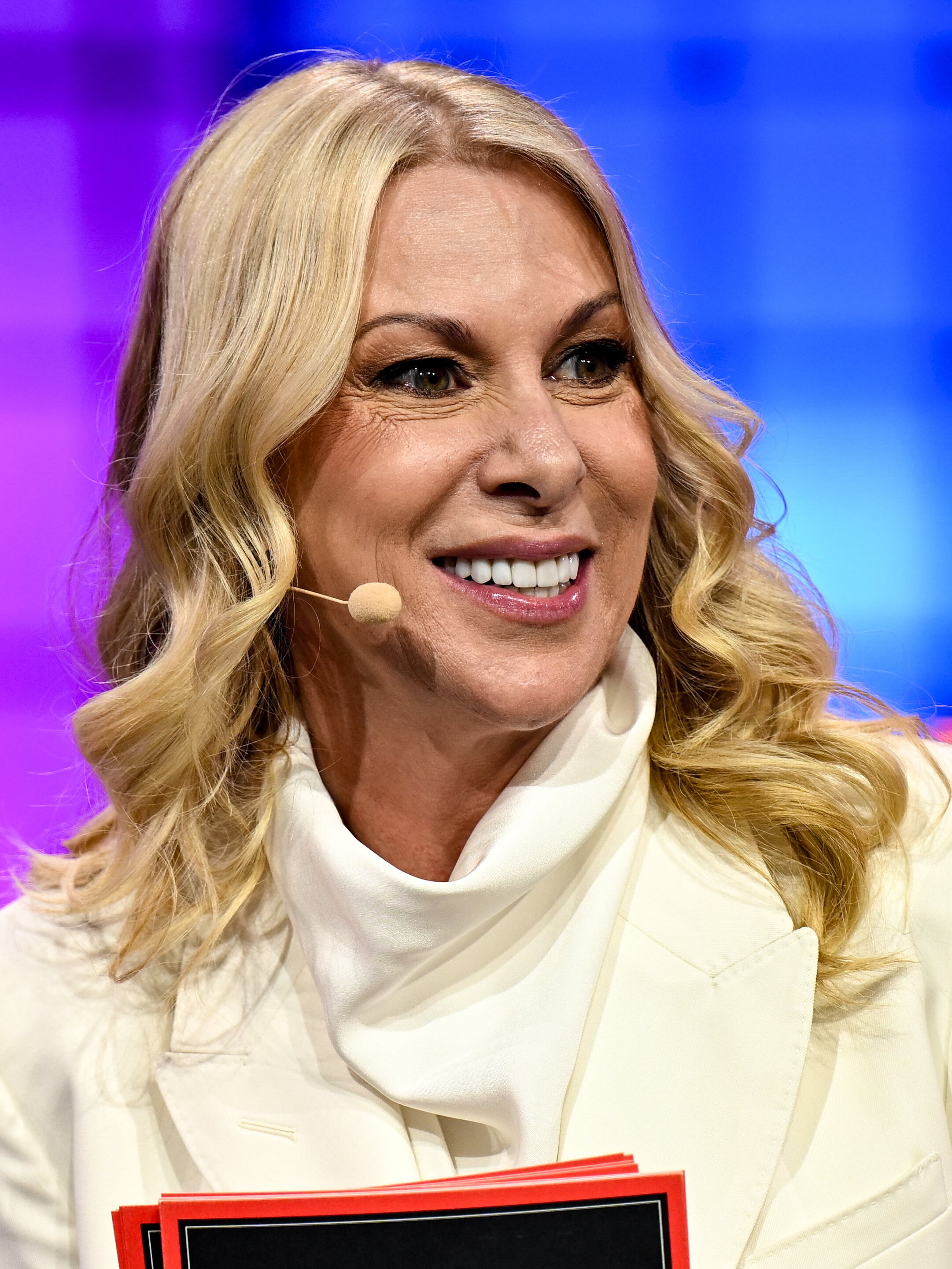
- Sibley in 2025
- Born: 1969 (age 56–57)
- Education: Hobart and William Smith Colleges
- Occupation: Business executive
- Organization: TIME
- Title: CEO
- Term: Nov. 21, 2022 - present
- Predecessor: Edward Felsenthal
- Board member of: The B Team, Ad Council

Jessica Sibley (born circa 1969) is an American business executive. Currently CEO of TIME, she has previously held executive roles at the Wall Street Journal, Condé Nast, and BusinessWeek. She was publisher of The Week, and held roles at Forbes including chief sales officer, chief revenue officer, and chief operating officer. She was appointed TIME CEO in November 2022.

== Early life and education ==
Born circa 1969, Jessica Sibley graduated from Hobart and William Smith Colleges in Geneva, New York.

== Career ==
=== Early positions ===
Early in her career, Sibley worked at the Wall Street Journal as vice president of multimedia sales for New York, New England and Europe. She also held senior roles at the publisher Condé Nast, including executive director and associate publisher positions at Condé Nast titles The New Yorker and Teen Vogue. Sibley was named senior vice president and worldwide publisher of BusinessWeek in early 2008. She was hired as the news publisher of The Week on June 28, 2010.

=== Forbes roles ===
In June 2014, Forbes appointed her VP of advertising sales for the Eastern Region. She subsequently served as the company's senior VP of US and Europe, as well as chief sales officer. She was appointed chief revenue officer in January 2020, then chief operating officer in January 2022. Along with revenue operations and sales, at Forbes she was responsible for the BrandVoice, Insights, and ForbesLive platforms. According to Forbes CEO Mike Federle, as CRO, she "led the sales organization to three consecutive years of record results."

=== CEO of TIME ===
On November 21, 2022, she was appointed the CEO of TIME by TIME owners Marc and Lynne Benioff, succeeding Edward Felsenthal. Stating that she intended for the company to be "cash flow positive" by 2025, she oversaw a number of immediate changes. According to Sibley, her first focus was pivoting the company away from business-to-consumer revenues to business-to-business revenues, resulting in TIME dropping its online paywall in June 2023. She also hired new executives, including new chief revenue officers in 2022, a new editor-in-chief in 2023, and a new chief strategy officer in 2024. She oversaw layoffs at TIME in 2024, calling them necessary to improve the company's financial position. The layoffs were criticized by The NewsGuild of New York and the Time Union. The layoffs were part of a broader strategy to focus on covering leadership (TIME's most commercially successful area) and to "provide journalism that serves these present and future leaders", including leaders in climate, AI, and health coverage.

In late 2024, she stated that the B2B revenue pivot was proving successful, with B2B advertising revenue up 18% from the year prior. TIME also partnered with ChatGPT that year, when she oversaw TIME signing a deal with OpenAI to give it access to the magazine's content archive. Espousing AI, she also oversaw a TIME AI podcast and various AI features on the TIME website. Sibley had overseen a significant increase in the number of TIME100 lists by 2025, also increasing the number of TIME-hosted gala events with corporate sponsorships, from seven events in 2023 to thirty events by late 2024.

On October 15, 2025, Sibley interviewed Japanese rock star Yoshiki in a special presentation at Dreamforce 2025, discussing his self-created conversational AI avatar and the need for integrity and co-existence between artists and AI.

== Boards and committees ==
Sibley is a member of The B Team, a business non-profit, and is on the board of the Ad Council. She has also been a board advisor of Her Campus Media, the Business Marketing Association, the International Advertising Association, Chief, and Prota Fiori. Sibley was co-chair of IAB's CRO Council.

== Recognition ==
She accepted a "We the Peoples Global Leadership Award" on behalf of TIME from the United Nations Foundation in 2024.

== Personal life ==
Sibley lives in New York City with her husband and two children.
