= Victory Plan for Ukraine =

Peace plan for Ukraine proposed in October 2024

Victory Plan
План перемоги
- Ukraine Russian Federation NATO member states as of 2025 Territories controlled by Russia or pro-Russian separatists but claimed by Ukraine (Crimea, Donbas) with the support of the UNGA (Note: as of February 2022)
- Type: Peace enforcement
- Context: Russo-Ukrainian war
- Drafted: October 16, 2024
- Condition: NATO membership invitation to Ukraine; Just end to the Russo-Ukrainian war (Point 1)
- Amendment: 3 secret annexes (Points 2—4, partly)
- Expiration: Not meant for signing
- Languages: Ukrainian; English
- Five-point plan: 1. Geopolitical; 2. Defense; 3. Deterrence; 4. Economical; 5. Postwar safety; Unveiled at the Verkhovna Rada by Volodymyr Zelenskyy on 16 October 2024

In October 2024, Ukrainian president Volodymyr Zelenskyy unveiled the Victory plan for Ukraine, which includes the solution to the Russo-Ukrainian conflict and description of future national defense guarantees. The official goal of the plan is "to change the circumstances in such a way that Russia will be forced to peace".

== Points ==
The plan includes five points: one geopolitical, two military, one economical and one related to national defense and safety. The second, third and fourth points of the plan have classified conditions included, that were introduced only to the political leaders of the US, Germany, France, United Kingdom and Italy.

1. Inclusion of Ukraine into NATO and the end of the Russo-Ukrainian war. This implies geopolitical determination in Europe. This will be "a testament to the determination of Ukrainian partners" (mainly key Euro-Atlantic countries) and "will show how the partners see Ukraine in the renewed continental security architecture in the future".
2. Strengthening of the national defense. Implies the strengthening of Ukrainian positions on the territory of Russia in order to avoid the creation of buffer zones on the Ukrainian territory, lifting restrictions on strikes inside the Russian territory, strengthening Ukraine's air defense to a sufficient level of protection and joint defense operations with neighboring states within the reach of their air shield; access to satellite intelligence data of Ukrainian partners in real time, irreversible strengthening of the positions of the Defense and Security Forces of Ukraine and the destruction of Russia's offensive potential on the occupied territory of Ukraine.
3. Deterrence. Implies the placement of a comprehensive non-nuclear strategic package of deterring Russia's armed aggression and its military capabilities inside the Ukrainian territory.
4. Strategic economic potential. Envisages the investment of international partners in the production of critically important natural resources, such as uranium, titanium, lithium and graphite.
5. National safety. This point is designed for the post-war period. Zelenskyy assumed that in case of an agreement, Ukrainian units will be able to replace separate US military contingents stationed in Europe.

== Reaction ==
- France: French ministry of foreign affairs stated that it supports the plan.
- Germany: Chancellor Olaf Scholz has gone on record to say that Germany does not support the idea of inviting Ukraine to NATO during wartime.

== Comparative assessment ==
In August 2025, Nik Hynek and Michal Šenk suggested the template for analysis of peace plans in interstate war with assessments of respective suggestions during ongoing Russo-Ukrainian war. Two right-most columns are added for the November 2025 two 28-point drafts.

=== Comparative Table ===
C[onc]urrent peace plans across ten comparative criteria (Note: Combining comparative-historical and conflict-resolution analyses, authors developed and conceptualized a ten-criterion template for appraising peace proposals in major interstate wars, exemplified by Russo-Ukrainian war. It featured eight instructive settlements – the Treaty of Portsmouth ending the Russo-Japanese War (1905), the Moscow Peace Treaty concluding the Winter War (1940), the Korean Armistice Agreement (1953), the Austrian State Treaty (1955), the Camp David Accords (1978), the Geneva Accords on Afghanistan (1988), the Dayton Peace Agreement (1995) and the Khasavyurt Accord on Chechnya (1996) – each relevant through either Russia/USSR participation or design choices illuminating Russo-Ukrainian dilemmas.)Credit: Originally published by Peacebuilding in November 2025 - columns 1-7. (Note: Excluding two right-most columns 8-9.) ISSN: 2164-7259 (Print) 2164-7267 (Online)
Criterion	Ukraine "Victory" Agenda	Russia Maximalist Design	U.S. Mediated Partition	Europe–Ukraine Counter‑Initiative	China–Brazil "Friends of Peace" Plan	Istanbul Draft (2022 revival)	U.S.–Russia Draft Plan (2025)	European Proposal (2025)
Enforcement mechanisms	Strong emphasis on Western guarantees	Minimal; relies on Russian dominance	International monitors envisaged	EU/NATO backing; sanctions leverage	Vague; multipolar rhetoric	Weak; limited monitoring	None specified; relies on bilateral recognition	NATO-style guarantees from Western allies
Recovery & reconstruction	Western aid central	Russia assumes control of occupied areas	Partition with aid to both sides	EU-led recovery funds	Development aid promised	Limited; undefined	Rebuild Ukraine using seized Russian funds	Western economic aid
Societal alignment	High domestic support for sovereignty	Russian domestic narrative only	Divisive; Ukrainians reject partition	Strong Ukrainian civil society backing	Low resonance in Ukraine	Mixed; contested	Mixed signals; neutrality imposed	Strong Ukrainian public support
Security guarantees	NATO/EU integration	Neutrality enforced by Russia	U.S./UN guarantees proposed	NATO umbrella	Multipolar guarantees (China, Brazil)	Neutrality clauses; weak guarantees	Ukraine neutral; conditional U.S. guarantees	NATO Article 5 mirror; robust guarantees
Territorial concessions	Rejects concessions	Demands recognition of annexations	Partition envisaged	Rejects concessions	Freeze lines; ambiguous	Crimea/Donbas unresolved	Recognizes Crimea, Donetsk, Luhansk as Russian; freeze Kherson/Zaporizhzhia	Crimea remains under Russian control; Ukraine retains claim
Accountability / justice	War crimes prosecution central	Russia absolved of responsibility	Deferred accountability	Strong emphasis on justice	Downplayed	Deferred	Amnesty, prisoner exchange only	War crimes trials, reparations
External mediation	Western allies	Russia only	U.S. broker	EU role	China–Brazil mediation	Turkey broker	U.S.–Russia backchannel	European-led diplomacy
Neutrality / alliances	Rejects neutrality	Demands neutrality	Neutral buffer envisaged	NATO integration	Neutrality promoted	Neutrality clause	Ukraine constitutionally barred from NATO	Ukraine eventually joins NATO and the EU
Economic aid / incentives	Western aid packages	Russian subsidies	Aid split between entities	EU recovery funds	Development aid promised	Limited	Frozen Russian assets diverted; U.S. profit share	Western weapons, aid
Durability / stability	High if backed by West	Low; coercive	Fragile; partition unstable	Stronger with EU/NATO support	Weak; lacks enforcement	Fragile; draft abandoned	Politically fragile; contradiction, vague wording	High if Western support sustained

Sources

- Hynek, N. & Šenk, J. (2025). Ukraine–Russia peace plans: historical lessons, operationalising criteria, and comparative assessment. DOI: 10.1080/21647259.2025.2585235.
- Sollfrank, A. & Boeke, S. (2024). Enablement and Logistics as Critical Success Factors for Military Operations: Comparing Russian and NATO Approaches. The RUSI Journal, 169(7), 10–22. DOI: 10.1080/03071847.2024.2434137.
- Mello, P. A. & Saideman, S. M. (2019). The politics of multinational military operations. Contemporary Security Policy, 40(1), 30–37. DOI: 10.1080/13523260.2018.1522737.
- Cancian, M. F. & Snegovaya, M. (2025). The Unfinished Plan for Peace in Ukraine: Provision by Provision. Center for Strategic & International Studies, Published 24 Nov 2025: CSIS analysis.
- Media references: Axios (18 Nov 2025), POLITICO (19 Nov 2025), Al Jazeera (21 Nov 2025), Sky News (23 Nov 2025), Newsweek (24 Nov 2025), The Independent (24 Nov 2025).

== See also ==
- Ukraine's Peace Formula – 2022 Ukrainian diplomatic initiative
- June 2024 Ukraine peace summit – International summit in Switzerland
- 2022 Ramstein Air Base meeting – International conference organized by the United States
- Ukraine Democracy Defense Lend-Lease Act of 2022 – 2022 U.S. law authorizing arms transfers to Ukraine
- Budapest Memorandum – 1994 CSCE conference agreements
- Crimea Platform – Ukrainian diplomatic initiative aimed at recovering control over Crimea
- Multinational Force–Ukraine – Proposed force for peace enforcement
- Peace negotiations in the Russo-Ukrainian war (2022–present): Overview of key negotiation points
