= Coller EQT =

British investor firm in the private equity secondary market

- Formerly: Coller Capital Limited
- Type: Subsidiary
- Industry: Private equity
- Founded: 1990; 36 years ago
- Founder: Jeremy Coller
- Headquarters: London, United Kingdom
- Number of locations: 11
- Products: Private Equity Secondaries; Investment funds
- AUM: $50 billion (2026)
- Owner: EQT AB
- Number of employees: 316 (2025)
- Website: collereqt.com

Coller EQT, formerly Coller Capital Limited, is a British investment firm founded in 1990 by Jeremy Coller. It has been owned by EQT AB since August 2026, following a $3.7 billion buy-out in January that year.

Jeremy Coller is Head and Chief Investment Officer of Coller EQT. He is also known for philanthropic work in animal welfare and food system sustainability.

== History ==
Coller Capital launched its first fund, Coller International Partners I, in 1995, targeting the emerging market for private equity secondaries.

One of its first major transactions came in 1998, when the firm acquired a US$265 million portfolio of limited partnership interests from Shell's US pension trust — then the largest deal of its kind. Coller reportedly committed his entire US$240 million fund to the purchase.

In the 2000s and 2010s, Coller Capital expanded its presence in the secondary market, acquiring portfolios from banks, pension funds, and other institutional investors.

The following year, it launched a credit secondaries strategy with Coller Credit Opportunities I, raising US$1.4 billion. In 2025, the firm closed a $6.8 billion funding round for Coller Credit Opportunities II, and in November 2025 announced that its "evergreen" secondaries fund had passed US$1 billion AUM.

In August 2025, the firm completed a US$3 billion continuation fund transaction with TPG Twin Brook Capital Partners. In September 2025, the firm led a $2.3 billion secondaries continuation vehicle with Benefit Street Partners. In 2024, the company launched the Secondaries Institute to support research and education in the secondary market.

In November 2025, State Street Investment Management acquired a minority stake in Coller Capital.

In January 2026, the firm closed its ninth core secondaries fund, Coller International Partners IX (CIP IX), raising $17 billion.

On January 22, 2026, Coller Capital agreed to be acquired by Swedish buyout group EQT for up to $3.7 billion, comprising shares and additional consideration tied to performance. Under the agreement, Coller Capital will form a dedicated secondaries platform within EQT, branded “Coller EQT,” with Jeremy Coller continuing to lead the business and reporting to EQT’s chief executive. The firms stated that Coller’s origination and investment process would remain independent following the transaction.

The acquisition completed on 31 August 2026. The firm now operates under the brand Coller EQT and is reported as a new Secondaries segment within EQT. Jeremy Coller was appointed Head and Chief Investment Officer of Coller EQT and joined EQT's executive committee.

== Business model ==
The firm provides liquidity to private equity investors by acquiring interests in private equity funds, portfolios of private companies and other related assets. Sellers include financial institutions, corporations, government bodies, family offices, and charitable foundations. The firm holds interests in more than 850 private equity funds and around 8,000 companies, on behalf of investors. The firm raises closed-end funds and earns revenue through management fees on committed capital and carried interest on realised gains. In 2024 Coller Capital introduced an open-ended secondaries vehicle, CollerEquity.

== Operations ==
Coller Capital is regarded as one of the world’s largest investors in the private equity secondary market.

The firm operates from 11 offices, including in London, New York, Hong Kong, Tokyo and Korea. As of 2025, the firm claims to employ 316 people, including 31 partners.

== Funds ==
Fund name	Closed	Commitments
Coller International Partners I	1996	$84 million; now liquidated
Coller International Partners II	1998	$240 million; now liquidated
Coller International Partners III	2000	$712 million; now liquidated
Coller International Partners IV	2002	$2.6 billion; now liquidated
Coller International Partners V	2007	$4.8 billion; 200 institutional investors
Coller International Partners VI	2012	$5.5 billion; 200 institutional investors
Coller International Partners VII	2015	$7.15 billion; 170 institutional investors
Coller International Partners VIII	2021	$9 billion
Coller International Partners IX	2026	$17 billion
Coller Credit Opportunities I	2022	$1.4 billion
Coller Credit Opportunities II	2025	$6.8 billion

== Publications ==
The firm publishes research through affiliated institutes and industry journals.

Key publications:

- Global Private Equity Barometer: biannual survey of institutional investors.
- Private Equity Findings: research digest by the Coller Institute of Private Equity (London Business School).
- ESG Report: environmental, social and governance policy reports.
- Coller Venture Review: innovation and venture policy journal (Tel Aviv University).

== Environmental, social and governance (ESG) ==
The firm is the founding sponsor of the FAIRR Initiative, a network that analyses the environmental, social and governance risks in the global food sector.

In October 2025, Coller Capital was reported as a founding signatory of Promote Giving, an initiative through which fund managers donate five percent of performance fees to charitable causes.

== Awards ==
Coller Capital has received various industry awards, including “European Secondaries Firm of the Year” and “Secondaries Deal of the Year”, from organisations such as the British Private Equity & Venture Capital Association (BVCA), Financial News and Private Equity International.

== See also ==
- Private equity secondary market
- Jeremy Coller
- FAIRR Initiative
