= Ukraine's Peace Formula =

2022 Ukrainian diplomatic initiative

Ukraine's Peace Formula (President Zelensky Peace Formula)
- «Українська формула миру» (Ukrainian)
- Credit:UN OCHA February 2024
- Keywords: security, territorial integrity, justice, safety, end of the war
- Sponsors: United24 ambassadors
- Framework programme: Preparations of Summit on Peace in Ukraine'24
- Reference: Ukraine's Peace Formula Philosophy by Volodymyr Zelenskyy
- Objective: Just conclusion of Russo-Ukrainian war
- Location: (unveiled) Bali, Indonesia
- Partners: See §
- Duration: (as drafted) August 7, 2022 (presented) November 15, 2022 (3 years, 10 months, 2 weeks and 5 days ago) – present

The Ukraine's Peace Formula is an initiative and diplomatic platform that Ukraine proposed to the world community to achieve a just conclusion to the Russo-Ukrainian war.

== History ==
In September 2022 Ukrainian President Volodymyr Zelenskyy addressed the UN General Assembly in a pre-recorded speech that focused on five preconditions for peace formula. There were punishment for aggression, protection of life, restoration of security and territorial integrity, security guarantees and determination to defend oneself.

On 15 November 2022 during the G20 Bali Summit Zelenskyy announced the detailed contents of the 10-point "peace formula".

== Proposals ==
The November 2022 Ukrainian proposal consists of 10 points, as reported by Ukrainian authorities and by media:

1. Nuclear safety, especially that of the Zaporizhzhia nuclear power plant
2. Food security for Asian and African countries
3. Energy security and restoration of Ukraine's energy infrastructure
4. Release of all prisoners and the return of Ukrainian children deported to Russia
5. Restoration of the Russia–Ukraine border to that prior to the 2014 annexation of Crimea, in line with Article 2 of the Charter of the United Nations
6. Full withdrawal of Russian military forces from Ukraine and cessation of hostilities
7. Prosecution of war crimes in the Russian invasion of Ukraine, including the creation of a special tribunal for Russian war crimes
8. Assessment of ecological damage, including that caused by the destruction of the Kakhovka Dam; prosecution of those responsible; recovery and reconstruction
9. Guarantees against future Russian aggression
10. A multilateral peace conference with a legally binding international treaty.

== Evaluations ==
Foreign minister of Russia Sergei Lavrov said: "It is completely not feasible. It is not possible to implement this."

U.S. President Joe Biden: "We're going to continue to support Ukraine's diplomatic effort to deliver a just and lasting peace".

French President Emmanuel Macron: "The plan ... is an essential basis for discussions on this path, which should lead us towards an international peace conference".

Secretary General of NATO Jens Stoltenberg: "Ukraine needs a just and sustainable peace, and I therefore strongly welcome President Zelenskyy's ten-point plan to achieve that goal."

President Zelenskyy noted that the Ukrainian peace formula can become a universal basis for ending other military conflicts on the planet and overcoming global problems.

== Diplomatic meetings ==
The Ukrainian peace formula was discussed at the following international meetings (Russia was not invited).

A meeting was held on 24 June 2023 in Copenhagen, Denmark, between national security advisers and representatives from Ukraine, United States, European Union, United Kingdom, Denmark, Brazil, India, Italy, Canada, Germany, South Africa, Saudi Arabia, Turkey, France, Japan and other countries.

A meeting was held on 5–6 August 2023 in Jeddah, Saudi Arabia – between 42 representatives of Western countries as well as Brazil, Egypt, India, Indonesia, South Africa, South Korea and China.

A meeting was held on 28–29 October 2023 in Valletta, Malta – between 66 representatives from the West and Global South. Among the new participants were Armenia, Holy See and Mexico.

At the meeting in Malta, the participants adopted a document in which they confirmed their intention to convene a Global Summit at the level of leaders of the countries participating in the Peace Formula, at which all provisions of the Ukrainian Peace Formula are expected to be approved by state leaders.

On 1 December 2023 in Kyiv, the tenth working meeting with representatives of 83 states and three international organizations on the implementation of the peace formula was held in Kyiv. On the Ukrainian side, the event was attended by: Minister of Defense Rustem Umierov, Minister of Justice Denys Maliuska, Deputy Speaker of the Verkhovna Rada Olena Kondratiuk, Leader of the Crimean Tatar People, People's Deputy Mustafa Dzhemilev, Nobel Peace Prize laureate, human rights activist Oleksandra Matviichuk, Head of the Office of the President of Ukraine Andriy Yermak.

United24 ambassador Richard Branson addressed the participants with a motivational speech. At the meeting, the president of the international non-governmental organization of public figures The Elders, the former President of Ireland Mary Robinson and the former Secretary-General of the United Nations Ban Ki-moon made statements in which calls were made to all countries to make efforts to ensure a just peace in Ukraine based on the key principles of the UN Charter. It was also about the importance of creating a special tribunal for the crime of aggression.

== Global Peace Summit ==
Deputy Head of the Office of the President of Ukraine Igor Zhovkva said that the 10-point peace plan would be discussed at a global summit of world leaders that could take place in early 2024. In April 2024, Swiss leaders confirmed that a high-level June 2024 Ukraine peace conference would be held.

In December 2025, Zelensky met UK Prime Minister Keir Starmer, French President Emmanuel Macron, and German Chancellor Friedrich Merz in Downing Street to discuss Ukraine's newly drafted peace plan from Ukraine–US talks in Florida.

== See also ==
- Peace negotiations in the Russo-Ukrainian war (2022–present)
- China's Position on the Political Settlement of the Ukrainian Crisis – 2023 position paper on Russo-Ukrainian war
- Multinational Force–Ukraine – Proposed force for peace enforcement
- Victory Plan for Ukraine – Peace plan for Ukraine proposed in October 2024
