= Fondation Agir Contre l'Exclusion =

French foundation

Fondation Agir Contre l'Exclusion (FACE) is a private foundation in France. The aim is to help young people from humble backgrounds to join the private sector.

== Overview ==
It was founded by Martine Aubry in 1993. The founding partner companies were AXA, Groupe Casino, Club Med, Crédit Lyonnais, Danone, Darty, FIMALAC, Euro-RSCG-Havas, Lyonnaise des Eaux, Péchiney, RATP, Renault, and Sodexho. Its current President is Gérard Mestrallet, the CEO of GDF Suez. Bernard Kouchner is a board member.
