= The Elders (organization) =

International non-governmental organization

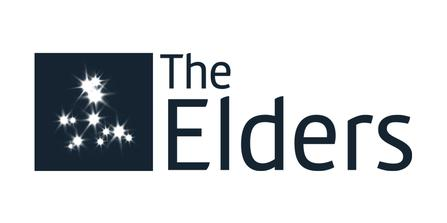
- Founded: 18 July 2007
- Founder: Nelson Mandela
- Purpose: "help resolve some of the world's most intractable conflicts" and other issues.
- Location: London
- Members: 12 (including 4 Elders Emeritus)
- Key people: Juan Manuel Santos (Chair); Alistair Fernie (CEO)
- Employees: 18 (as of 2022)
- Website: theelders.org

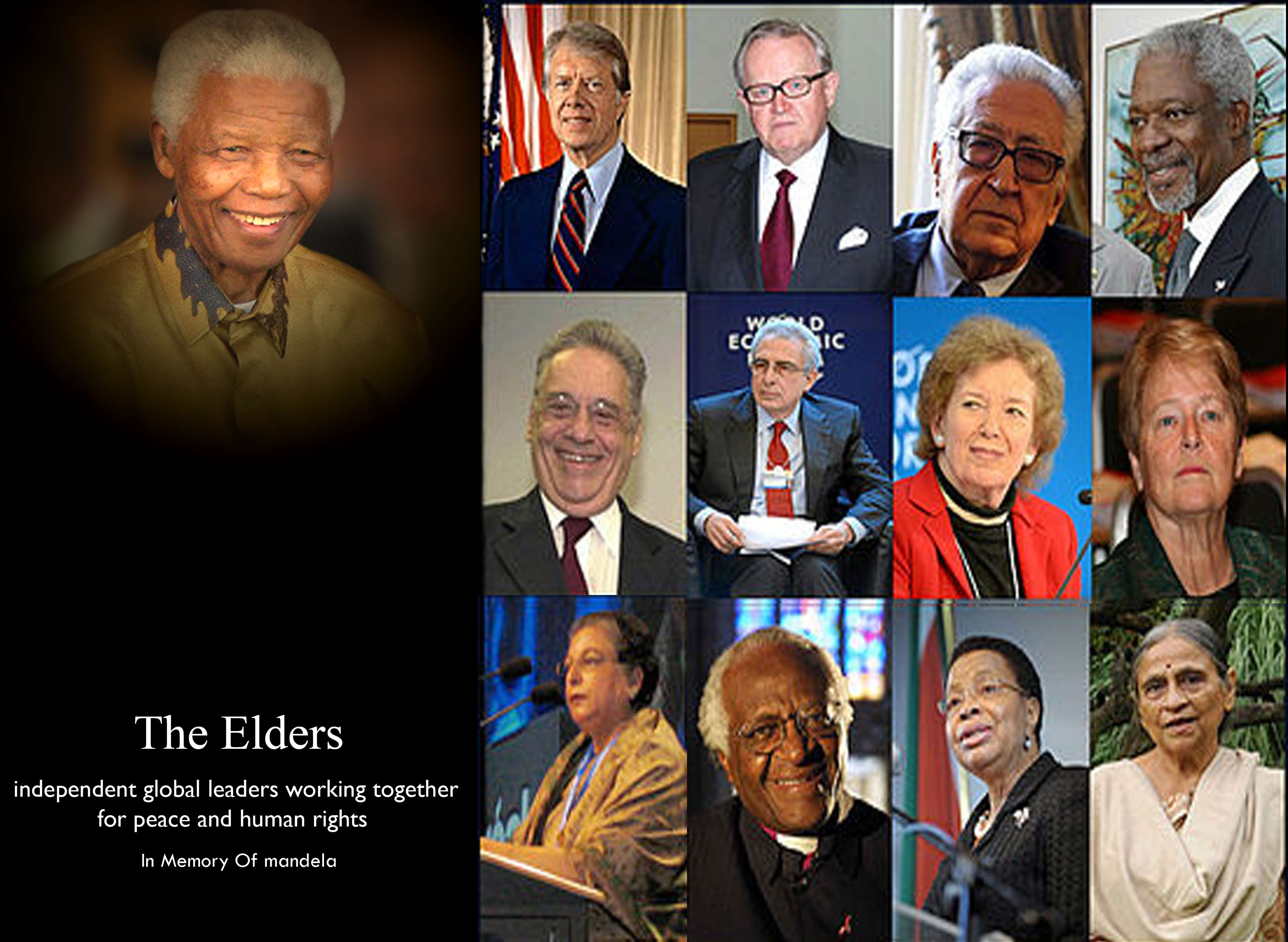
The Elders (2013)

The Elders is an international non-governmental organisation of public figures noted as senior statesmen, peace activists and human rights advocates, who were brought together by former president of South Africa Nelson Mandela in 2007. They describe themselves as "independent global leaders working together for peace, justice, human rights and a sustainable planet". The goal Mandela set for The Elders was to use their "almost 1,000 years of collective experience" to work on solutions for seemingly insurmountable problems such as climate change, HIV/AIDS, and poverty, as well as to "use their political independence to help resolve some of the world's most intractable conflicts".

== History ==
As of 2025, The Elders is chaired by Juan Manuel Santos, and consists of twelve Elders and four Elders Emeritus. Mary Robinson served as chair from 2018 until 2024; Kofi Annan served as chair from 2013 until his death in 2018; Desmond Tutu served for six years as chair before stepping down in May 2013, and remained an Elder Emeritus until his death in 2021.

The group was initiated by English philanthropist Richard Branson and musician and human rights activist Peter Gabriel, together with anti-apartheid activist and former South African President Nelson Mandela. Mandela announced the formation of the group on his eighty-ninth birthday on 18 July 2007 in Johannesburg, South Africa.

At the launch ceremony, an empty chair was left on stage for Aung San Suu Kyi, the human rights activist who was a political prisoner in Burma/Myanmar at the time. Present at the launch were Kofi Annan, Jimmy Carter, Graça Machel, Nelson Mandela, Mary Robinson, Desmond Tutu, Muhammad Yunus, and Li Zhaoxing. Members who were not present at the launch were Ela Bhatt, Gro Harlem Brundtland, Lakhdar Brahimi, and Fernando Henrique Cardoso.

Martti Ahtisaari joined The Elders in September 2009, Hina Jilani and Ernesto Zedillo in July 2013, and Ricardo Lagos in June 2016. In June 2017, former UN Secretary-General Ban Ki-moon also joined the group. Zeid Raad Al Hussein, Juan Manuel Santos and Ellen Johnson Sirleaf joined The Elders in January 2019. Elbegdorj Tsakhia, former President and Prime Minister of Mongolia, joined in October 2022.

The Elders are funded by a group of donors who are named on the advisory council.

== Members ==
=== The Elders ===
1. Gro Harlem Brundtland, former Prime Minister of Norway and former Director-General of the World Health Organization
2. Helen Clark, former Prime Minister of New Zealand and former Administrator of the United Nations Development Programme
3. Hina Jilani, international human rights defender from Pakistan
4. Graça Machel (Co-Deputy Chair), former Education Minister of Mozambique, President of the Foundation for Community Development, widow of Samora Machel and widow of Nelson Mandela
5. Mary Robinson, former President of Ireland and former United Nations High Commissioner for Human Rights
6. Ernesto Zedillo, former President of Mexico
7. Ban Ki-moon (Co-Deputy Chair), former Secretary-General of the United Nations
8. Ellen Johnson Sirleaf, former President of Liberia, Nobel Peace Prize laureate
9. Juan Manuel Santos (Chair), former President of Colombia, Nobel Peace Prize laureate
10. Zeid Raad Al Hussein, former UN High Commissioner for Human Rights
11. Elbegdorj Tsakhia, former President and Prime Minister of Mongolia
12. Denis Mukwege, Congolese gynecologist, Nobel Peace Prize laureate

=== Elders Emeritus ===
1. Lakhdar Brahimi, former Foreign Minister of Algeria and United Nations envoy
2. Fernando Henrique Cardoso, former President of Brazil
3. Ricardo Lagos, former President of Chile

=== Former Elders ===
- Aung San Suu Kyi, Myanmar opposition leader and Nobel Peace Prize laureate, was an honorary elder. Until her release from house arrest in 2010 the Elders kept an empty chair at each of their meetings, to mark their solidarity with Suu Kyi and Burma/Myanmar's other political prisoners. In line with the requirement that members of The Elders should not hold public office, Suu Kyi stepped down as an honorary Elder following her election to parliament on 1 April 2012.
- Li Zhaoxing, former Foreign Minister of the People's Republic of China, attended the launch.
- Muhammad Yunus, founder of Grameen Bank, microcredit pioneer and Nobel Peace Prize laureate, is a former Elder. Yunus stepped down as a member of The Elders in September 2009, stating that he was unable to do justice to his membership of the group due to the demands of his work.

=== Deceased Elders ===
- Martti Ahtisaari, former President of Finland, Nobel Peace Prize laureate
- Kofi Annan, former Secretary-General of the United Nations, Nobel Peace Prize laureate was Chair of The Elders from 2013 to 2018.
- Ela Bhatt, founder of the Self-Employed Women's Association of India.
- Nelson Mandela, a Nobel Peace Prize laureate and former president of South Africa, was the founder of The Elders.
- Desmond Tutu, Archbishop Emeritus of Cape Town, former Archbishop Primate of the Anglican Church of Southern Africa and former Chair of South Africa's Truth and Reconciliation Commission, Nobel Peace Prize laureate
- Jimmy Carter, former President of the United States, Nobel Peace Prize laureate

=== Donors and team ===
The work of The Elders is coordinated and supported by a small team based in London. The team is headed by Alistair Fernie, who was appointed chief executive officer (CEO) in November 2021.

The Elders are independently funded by a group of donors, who also make up The Elders' Advisory Council: Richard Branson and Jean Oelwang (Virgin Unite), Peter Gabriel (The Peter Gabriel Foundation), Kathy Bushkin Calvin (The United Nations Foundation), Jeremy Coller and Lulit Solomon (J Coller Foundation), Randy Newcomb (Humanity United), Jeffrey Skoll and Sally Osberg (Skoll Foundation), Jeff Towers (Jeffrey Towers and Associates), and Marieke van Schaik (Dutch Postcode Lottery). Mabel van Oranje, former CEO of The Elders, sits on the advisory council in her capacity as Advisory Committee Chair of Girls Not Brides.

The Elders publish annual reports detailing the organisation's income and spending activity.

== Work ==
The Elders say they use their independence, collective experience and influence to work for peace, justice, human rights and a sustainable planet. In their 2023–27 Strategy, The Elders' focus will be on three existential threats – the climate crisis, nuclear weapons and pandemics – and the continuing scourge of conflict. The Elders also have four cross-cutting commitments across all initiatives: human rights, gender equality and women's leadership, multilateralism and intergenerational dialogue.

=== Current work ===
==== The climate crisis ====
In 2023–2027, The Elders say they will aim to hold big emitters to account for policies that align with the 1.5 °C limit and the global nature goal, and accelerate just transitions. They say will seek to influence the shape of the new climate finance goal to be agreed by 2025, and push for implementation of the UN agreement to operationalise a loss and damage fund. The Elders have expressed support the re-engineering of global development finance institutions to raise trillions of dollars for tackling the climate crisis, and say they want to see the voices of youth and women heard and respected so that a new political space can be created for more ambitious climate actions.

==== Pandemics ====
The Elders have said they will advocate for a robust global PPR (Pandemic Preparedness and Response) agenda that should be treated as a global public good, requiring global public investment. They say that tackling pandemics must involve all parts of society, government, and the economy, and resilient and that publicly funded health systems based on the principles of Universal Health Coverage (UHC) are crucial.

==== Nuclear weapons ====
The Elders say their goal is a world where current and future generations are free from the threat of nuclear destruction. They say they will use their moral voice to challenge world leaders, embolden multilateral approaches, and mobilise civil society. This includes advocating for more voices to be heard in decision-making, particularly women and youth.

==== Conflict ====
The Elders say they will focus their efforts on advocating for international law and accountability, and on engagement in a limited number of conflict situations where they are they have the ability to play a distinctive role. They have said they initially plan to prioritise Russia’s war on Ukraine and the Israeli-Palestinian conflict.

On 20 October 2023 Mary Robinson discussed with representatives of Ukrainian President's Office implementation of Ukrainian Peace Formula. On 1 December 2023 President The Elders took part in a working meeting with representatives of 83 states on the implementation of the Ukrainian Peace Formula in Kyiv, Ukraine.

=== Past work ===
==== Universal health care (2016–2022) ====
At the Women Deliver conference in May 2016, The Elders launched a new initiative to campaign for universal health coverage (UHC) as part of their efforts to support and implement the UN Sustainable Development Goals (SDGs).

The initiative focused on four areas:

1. Promoting UHC as the best way to achieve the health Sustainable Development Goal.
2. Promoting UHC's health, economic and political benefits;
3. Prioritising women, children and adolescents in UHC's implementation;
4. Reiterating the role of public financing in sustainably funding UHC.

In September 2016, Gro Harlem Brundtland delivered a keynote speech at a high-level event on the sidelines of the 71st UN General Assembly in New York. Joined by Margaret Chan, Director-General of the WHO and health ministers of South Africa and Thailand, she called for courageous leadership to achieve Universal Health Coverage by 2030.

In January 2017, Kofi Annan sent letters to Indian leaders to commend the progress made in reforming the Indian healthcare system, and Gro Harlem Brundtland and Ernesto Zedillo delivered keynote speeches at the Prince Mahidol Awards Conference in Bangkok, Thailand. Gro Harlem Brundtland highlighted the importance of inclusive health policy and Ernesto Zedillo explained how to sustainably implement Universal Health Coverage.

Highlighting the link between access to affordable health care and gender equality, in January 2017, two members of The Elders expressed concern at the re-introduction of the Mexico City Policy by the recently inaugurated President of the United States, Donald Trump. The pro-abortion activist Gro Harlem Brundtland said: "This decision puts the health of women and children at risk" and warned that "vulnerable people will die unnecessarily."

==== Refugees and migration ====
In October 2015, Kofi Annan, Gro Brundtland and Hina Jilani joined UN High Commissioner for Human Rights Prince Zeid Ra'ad Al Hussein and William L. Swing, the Director General of the International Organization for Migration, at an event on the refugee and migration crisis at the Graduate Institute in Geneva.

During the event, Gro Harlem Brundtland said "Too many leaders are not only shy when it comes to making this case to their people, they fundamentally lack the courage to do so...". Prince Zeid Ra'ad Al Hussein also rejected the dehumanising rhetoric adopted by some politicians towards refugees and migrants.

Ahead of the UN Summit for Refugees and Migrants in September 2016, Kofi Annan, Maarti Ahtisaari and Lakhdar Brahimi visited Germany to launch a report calling for stronger political will to ensure that responsibility is truly shared between countries, and for better protection of the vulnerable. They met the then-Foreign Minister Frank-Walter Steinmeier, and Federal President Joachim Gauck, and also visited a refugee resettlement centre in Berlin to hear directly from new arrivals to Germany.

The report "In Challenge Lies Opportunity: How the world must respond to refugees and mass migration" outlined four key principles which The Elders believe should be at the heart of the international response to refugees and mass migration:

1. Response mechanisms to large flows of people must be developed and properly coordinated, both regionally and internationally
2. Assistance to major refugee-hosting countries must be enhanced
3. Resettlement opportunities must be increased, along with additional pathways for admission
4. Human rights and refugee protection must be upheld and strengthened

Three Elders attended the UN Summit for Refugees and Migrants on 19 September 2016, which was held during the 71st Session of the United Nations' General Assembly. Martti Ahtisaari, Hina Jilani and Mary Robinson spoke at the high-level Round Tables which addressed different aspects of the topic: vulnerabilities of refugees and migrants, responsibility-sharing and respect for international law, and addressing the drivers of migration, respectively.

In January 2017, The Elders condemned the US refugee ban, enacted by the recently inaugurated President of the United States, Donald J. Trump. Kofi Annan said: "It is deeply regrettable that a nation of immigrants should turn its back so harshly on refugees escaping violence and war.

==== Stronger UN ====
At the Munich Security Conference in February 2015, the Elders launched the "Stronger UN" initiative, which promoted a series of reforms to strengthen the United Nations. This included a review of the composition of the Security Council and of the appointment of the Secretary-General.

Noting that seventy years since its founding, the UN was still falling short of its Charter pledge "to save succeeding generations from the scourge of war", The Elders proposed to:

1. Make the Security Council more representative of the world today, by introducing a new category of non-permanent members that can be immediately re-elected if they obtained the trust of the other members. As such, they would become de facto permanent members.
2. Break the deadlock in the Security Council in situations of atrocity crimes by compelling P-5 members to pledge that they will not use or threaten to use their veto in case of humanitarian crisis where people are victims of genocide or other atrocities.
3. Urge the Security Council to make more regular and systematic use of the "Arria formula" to give groups representing people in zones of conflict the opportunity to inform and influence Council decisions.
4. Make the selection process of the Secretary-General more transparent and fair

At the World Humanitarian Summit in May 2016, several Elders featured in a video alongside Salil Shetty, Secretary-General of Amnesty International and Simon Adams, Executive-Director of the Global Center for the Responsibility to Protect, calling for veto restraint and increased cooperation amongst the Permanent Members of the UN Security Council to prevent mass atrocities and save lives.

In 2016, some of The Elders' recommendations on the selection of the new Secretary-General were adopted by the UN. For the first time, the names of candidates for the position of Secretary-General were publicly circulated, and all declared candidates participated in public hearings in the General Assembly. These changes led to a notable increase in the transparency of the selection process.

==== Climate change ====
Prior to the 2009 United Nations Climate Change Conference in Copenhagen, The Elders launched the Climate Change initiative together with their grandchildren. The Elders believe that strong leadership is required at all levels in order to deliver a sustainable future. They strongly welcomed the Paris Agreement on Climate Change reached at the COP21 summit in December 2015, and are working to ensure it is now implemented fully and fairly.

The Elders believe that as climate change goes hand in hand with sustainable development, a holistic policy approach that is able to incorporate the voice of civil society and grassroots activities is needed. In this regard, in 2012, The Elders engaged with four young activists in an inter-generational debate on the change needed to secure a sustainable future for the planet, in the run-up to the UN Conference on Sustainable Development (Rio+20). Similarly, in 2016, Elders such as Mary Robinson and Gro Harlem Brundtland participated in the Social Good Summit in New York, in which they took part in dialogues with global climate and young activists.

While The Elders condemned the announcement in June 2017 by President Trump of his intention to withdraw from the Paris Agreement, they note that this has in fact galvanised action by states and cities. They maintain the need to hold governments and businesses to their word so that the deal is implemented in full and in good faith, with adequate means to ratchet up ambition and have reiterated this in subsequent meetings including with Pope Francis and President Macron in late 2017.

In 2023, in advance of COP28 in Dubai, the group released a statement outlining their call for meaningful climate action. After some controversial remarks by COP president Sultan Al Jaber during the early December gathering, Elders chair Mary Robinson, writing on social media, repeated the need to stop burning fossil fuels and adopt renewable energy.

==== Equality for women and girls ====
Commitment to gender equality is a cornerstone of The Elders' engagement in securing dignity and rights for all. From Universal Health Coverage to climate change and mass migration, to peacebuilding and protecting human rights defenders, The Elders believe that women and girls have specific needs that demand appropriately-tailored policy responses.

This includes considering the impact of religion and tradition on women's rights, addressing the harmful practice of child marriage, supporting efforts to promote women as peacemakers, highlighting the specific burdens and responsibilities women face in societies most threatened by climate change, highlighting the scale of violence against women, addressing the effect of impunity in prolonging the occurrence of sexual violence in conflict – including exploitation by UN Peacekeeping missions – and prioritising the health needs of women in the implementation of Universal Health Coverage.

In July 2009 The Elders called for an end to harmful and discriminatory practices that are justified on the grounds of religion and tradition. Fernando Henrique Cardoso said that "the idea that God is behind discrimination is unacceptable" Jimmy Carter stated that the Elders call upon "all leaders to challenge and change the harmful teachings and practices, no matter how ingrained, which justify discrimination against women. We ask, in particular, that leaders of all religions have the courage to acknowledge and emphasise the positive messages of dignity and equality that all the world's major faiths share". New York Times columnist Nicholas Kristof later wrote that "The Elders are right that religious groups should stand up for a simple ethical principle: any person's human rights should be sacred, and not depend on something as earthly as their genitals."

==== Elders+Youngers ====
When Nelson Mandela founded The Elders in 2007, he told the group to listen to the marginalised – especially young people. The Elders' work with young people has consisted in meeting many passionate young people on peace, equality and protecting the environment. In 2012, The Elders and four young activists began an inter-generational debate about the change needed to secure a sustainable future, in the run-up to the UN Conference on Sustainable Development (Rio+20).

Beside collaborating with young climate activists, The Elders have also held roundtable discussions on African leadership, debated Egypt's revolution with young people in Cairo, discussed the refugee crisis and UN reform with young students at Sciences Po in Paris and, featured guest blogs from youth contributors on their website.

==== Iran ====
The Elders support greater openness and dialogue between Iran and the international community, and encourage Iran to play a stabilising role in the wider Middle East.

In their first visit to Iran as a group, The Elders travelled to Tehran in January 2014 to meet privately with the Iranian leadership. Delegation leader Kofi Annan and fellow Elders Martti Ahtisaari, Desmond Tutu and Ernesto Zedillo held a series of productive meetings on the easing of regional tensions; the spread of extremist violence internationally; human rights; and the Syrian crisis. They were encouraged by Iran's new spirit of openness and dialogue with the outside world.

In February 2015, The Elders met again with Foreign Minister Javad Zarif, on the margins of the Munich Security Conference, to encourage a successful conclusion of the P5+1 nuclear negotiations and to discuss solutions to regional security issues.

In July 2015, The Elders welcomed the agreement reached on Iran's nuclear programme between Iran, the P5+1 countries (US, Russia, China, UK, France and Germany) and the EU. They believe the agreement represents a historic opportunity to end decades of animosity between Iran and the West, especially the US, and to rebuild relationships on the basis of trust and mutual respect.

In 2016, The Elders issued a press release welcoming the lifting of sanctions against Iran as part of the implementation of the P5+1 nuclear deal, the Joint Comprehensive Plan of Action, which they continued to support throughout the year.

In January 2017, The Elders issued a statement following the death of former Iranian President Rafsanjani, stating that "Iran has lost one of its most influential leaders and a strong voice for reform and for the improvement of regional relations."

At the Munich Security Conference in February 2017 Ernesto Zedillo and Lakhdar Brahimi met again with Javad Zarif. They also hosted a panel debate to defend the Iran Nuclear Agreement, joined by HRH Prince Turki of Saudi Arabia and Sheikh Hamad of Qatar.

At the start of the 2026 Iran war, Juan Manuel Santos issued a statement calling for deescalation and argued that the United States and Israel's strikes "violate[d] international law and threaten regional and global security." A subsequent full statement form the Elders stated that the conflict "threaten[s] grave consequences for regional security and the global economy"

==== Israel and Palestine ====
The long-running Israeli–Palestinian conflict has been one of The Elders' top priorities since the group was founded. Given the far-reaching impact of the unresolved conflict and the power imbalance between the parties, The Elders believe the international community has a vital role to play in helping Israelis and Palestinians reach a lasting solution. Particularly, they insist that the peace efforts must be based on the respect for universal human rights and international humanitarian law, as well as that the siege on Gaza must be permanently lifted and that the boundaries between Israel and a viable Palestinian state must be based on the 1967 borders, including a Palestinian capital in East Jerusalem.

In this regard, in August 2009, The Elders visited Israel and the West Bank to draw attention to the impact of the long-running conflict on ordinary people, and to support efforts by Israelis and Palestinians to promote peace. They were joined on the trip by Richard Branson and Jeff Skoll. The Elders met Israeli President Shimon Peres, Palestinian Prime Minister Salam Fayyad, and local peace activists involved in non-violent demonstrations. The report of their visit said they hoped it would "spur leaders and ordinary citizens alike to actions that will further peace, human rights and justice for all in the Middle East".

Four Elders, Mary Robinson, Ela Bhatt, Lakhdar Brahimi, and Jimmy Carter, returned to the Middle East in October 2010 to visit Egypt, Gaza, Israel, Jordan, Syria and the West Bank. The aim was to encourage peace efforts with an emphasis on the need to reach "a just and secure peace for all" based on international law. Throughout the trip, The Elders held discussions on the peace process with political leaders, representatives of human rights organisations, student and youth groups, women's groups, business, civil society and opinion leaders.

During the trip, Mary Robinson said that "As Elders, we believe the two-state solution has the potential to deliver peace – but a more energetic and comprehensive approach is needed." The Elders also called for an immediate end to the Blockade of the Gaza Strip, describing it as an "illegal collective punishment" and "an impediment to peace." The Elders released a report outlining their conclusions following the visit, which they hoped would "be a helpful contribution to peace efforts."

In October 2012, Gro Harlem Brundtland, Jimmy Carter and Mary Robinson returned to the region, travelling to Israel, the West Bank and Egypt. In their discussions with political leaders, civil society, and humanitarian and human rights experts, the Elders sought to "express concern about the future of the two-state solution and highlight the effect of settlement expansion and other changes in the city of Jerusalem as a major impediment to peace between Israelis and Palestinians."

In May 2015, Jimmy Carter and Gro Harlem Brundtland visited Israel and Palestine and ended their visit to Israel and Palestine with a call for meaningful steps to stop the humanitarian crisis in Gaza and reconcile the different Palestinian factions. They held talks with President Mahmoud Abbas and senior political figures from both Israel and Palestine, civil society groups and ordinary citizens to hear their perspectives and convey The Elders' commitment to a fair and enduring resolution to the conflict.

The Elders supported the diplomatic efforts led by the French Government to keep the two-state solution alive through high-level conferences in Paris in June 2016 and in January 2017. They also welcomed the UN Security Council Resolution in December 2016 that called on Israel to immediately halt all settlement activity in the occupied Palestinian territories.

They fully support the Arab Peace Initiative, which calls for normal, peaceful and secure relations between Israel and the Arab world, in return for Israeli withdrawal from Palestinian territory occupied since 1967.

In 2017, The Elders condemned Donald Trump's decision to recognise Jerusalem as the capital of Israel stating this "greatly harms peace processes."

In November 2023, weeks into the deadly and bloody Gaza war, The Elders released a letter calling on U.S. President Joe Biden to "set out a serious peace plan, and help build a new coalition for peace to deliver it".

==== Myanmar ====
A delegation of Elders visited Myanmar for the first time as a group in September 2013. In their meetings with senior officials in the government, political leaders, religious leaders and civil society groups, Martti Ahtisaari, Gro Harlem Brundtland and Jimmy Carter explored how best they could support peace and inclusive development in the country.

The Elders returned to Myanmar in March and December 2014. In the first trip, they travelled to Nay Pyi Taw and Myitkyina, Kachin State, in Myanmar and to Mae Sot and Chiang Mai in Thailand and deepened their relations key interlocutors and focused particularly on representatives of the country's ethnic minorities. In the second one, they visited Yangon and Nay Pyi Taw in Myanmar and Chiang Mai in Thailand, and they reaffirmed their efforts to encourage sustained progress in Myanmar's transition process and called for an immediate end to the conflict.

The Elders welcomed the elections in Myanmar in November 2015 and the victory of Aung San Suu Kyi's National League for Democracy (NLD) in forming a civilian-led government.

In August 2016, Aung San Suu Kyi invited Kofi Annan to chair an independent Commission to assess the situation in Rakhine State, including the Rohingya community. The Commission published its final report in August 2017 and put forward recommendations to surmount the political, socio-economic and humanitarian challenges that currently face Rakhine State.

On publishing the report, Kofi Annan said: "Unless concerted action – led by the government and aided by all sectors of the government and society – is taken soon, we risk the return of another cycle of violence and radicalisation, which will further deepen the chronic poverty that afflicts Rakhine State."

The Elders supported Kofi Annan in this role, which he undertook in his own capacity.

At their October 2017 board meeting, The Elders issued a statement expressing their deep dismay and concern at the wave of violence and destruction that swept through Rakhine State from August 2017, displacing hundreds of thousands of Rohingya Muslims. They called on Myanmar's government and military leaders to allow displaced Rohingya in Bangladesh and other countries to return, and for their human rights and safety to be protected.

==== Zimbabwe ====
Zimbabwe has been a key focus of concern for The Elders since the group was formed in 2007. Once one of Africa's strongest economies, Zimbabwe has suffered sustained political and economic crises over the last two decades and its leaders are failing in their responsibilities to the country's people.

In November 2008, three members of the Elders – Jimmy Carter, Graça Machel and Kofi Annan – planned to visit Zimbabwe to draw attention to the country's escalating humanitarian and economic crises. A day before their planned travel to Harare, they were informed that they would be refused entry. Jimmy Carter said it was the first time he had been denied permission [link] to enter any country. The three Elders stayed in Johannesburg and were briefed by Zimbabwean political and business leaders, aid workers, donors, UN agencies and civil society representatives, many of whom travelled from Zimbabwe to see them. The Elders also held meetings with the leaders of South Africa and Botswana. At a press conference after their meetings, they said the situation was "worse than they could have imagined" and called for greater regional and global effort to alleviate the suffering of Zimbabweans. Graça Machel said that "the state is no longer able to offer basic services. It can no longer feed, educate or care for its citizens. It is failing its people."

Following the resignation of President Robert Mugabe in November, 2017 The Elders urged all stakeholders in Zimbabwe and the region to work together for a genuine democratic transition. In 2018 and beyond they will continue to stand in solidarity with the people of Zimbabwe, civil society and human rights defenders in holding the country's new leaders to account.

==== Child Marriage ====
The Elders are committed to ending the practice of child marriage. In June 2011, Desmond Tutu, Gro Brundtland and Mary Robinson visited Amhara, Ethiopia, to learn about child marriage in a region where half of all female children are married before the age of 15.

Alongside their fellow Elder Ela Bhatt, Tutu, Brundtland and Robinson also travelled to Bihar, India in February 2012. Together, they visited Jagriti, a youth-led project aimed at preventing child marriage, and encouraged the state government's efforts to tackle the issue.

In 2011, The Elders initiated Girls Not Brides: The Global Partnership to End Child Marriage, which brings together civil society organisations from around the world that work to tackle child marriage. The global partnership aims to support activists working for change at the grassroots and call on governments and global organisations to make ending child marriage an international priority. Girls Not Brides became a fully independent organization, spun off from The Elders, in 2013.

In July 2016, The Elders welcomed action taken by leaders in The Gambia, Tanzania and Uganda to end child marriage, as part of the African Union's continent-wide campaign to eradicate the harmful practice.

==== Côte d'Ivoire ====
Following widespread violence after long-awaited presidential elections in November 2010, The Elders committed to support efforts by the Ivorian government and civil society to promote reconciliation and healing in the country. Desmond Tutu, Kofi Annan and Mary Robinson visited Ivory Coast on 1–2 May 2011 during which, they not only "encouraged reconciliation and healing", but they also emphasised the importance of improving the country's security situation. Beside meeting the President Alassane Ouattara, Prime Minister Guillaume Soro and former President Laurent Gbagbo, they also brought together civil society organisations, including women's groups seeking a role in the peace process, and encouraged them to work together towards national reconciliation. They also visited a camp for internally displaced people to hear directly from ordinary people affected by the conflict.

Kofi Annan returned to Ivory Coast in January 2012 and October 2013 to support the ongoing reconciliation process. During his visit, he noted the progress that had been made and encouraged all Ivorians to participate in "the task of reconciliation and healing." in order to build an inclusive future and prepare for peaceful elections in 2015.

==== Cyprus ====
The Elders began working on Cyprus in September 2008, when the leaders of the Greek Cypriot and Turkish Cypriot communities formally entered into peace negotiations. Since then, they have visited the island four times to support all efforts to build peace, enhance trust, and sharing their experiences with leaders and civil society in order to encourage dialogue. Additionally, they worked with the Committee on Missing Persons in Cyprus and the Cyprus Friendship Programme to film the documentary Digging the Past in Search of the Future with the hope that this could help Cypriots to reach a common understanding about their shared past.

In October 2008, the Elders visited the island to support the newly begun peace talks between the Greek Cypriot and Turkish Cypriot leaders. Desmond Tutu said that "These opportunities don't come around very often". Elders Jimmy Carter, Lakhdar Brahimi and Desmond Tutu met political leaders, civil society representatives and young people from both communities. Throughout the visit they made it clear that they were visiting the island to offer support and not to get formally involvement in the peace process.

Gro Harlem Brundtland and Lakhdar Brahimi visited Athens, Ankara and Cyprus in September 2009 to encourage efforts to reunify the island. In Ankara they met Turkish President Abdullah Gül, and Greek Prime Minister George Papandreou in Athens. In Nicosia they met Turkish Cypriot leader Mehmet Ali Talat and the President of the Republic of Cyprus Demitris Christofias. The Elders also met local media and leading women from politics, business and civil society on the island.

In December 2009, Desmond Tutu, Jimmy Carter and Lakhdar Brahimi returned to Cyprus. They convened a public meeting on how trust could be engendered between conflicting communities and together with the Committee on Missing Persons filmed the documentary, Cyprus: Digging the Past in Search of the Future. The documentary follows the three Elders as they accompany four young Cypriots to learn about the search for the remains of thousands of missing people who were killed in the violence of the 1960s and 1970s. It was launched in early 2011 with special screenings in Nicosia and at the Houses of Parliament in London.. In Cyprus, Desmond Tutu and Gro Brundtland also met the newly elected leader of the Turkish Cypriot community, Derviş Eroğlu and the leader of the Greek Cypriot community, Demetris Christofias, and called for a renewed spirit of leadership in Cyprus. The Elders also met the Archbishop of the Church of Cyprus, Chrysostomos II, to discuss the role of religious leaders in peacebuilding.

==== Korean Peninsula ====
The Elders launched their Korean Peninsula initiative in April 2011, when a delegation led by Jimmy Carter made a six-day visit to the Republic of Korea (South Korea), the Democratic People's Republic of Korea (North Korea) and China. Jimmy Carter, together with Martti Ahtisaari, Gro Harlem Brundtland and Mary Robinson, aimed to alleviate tensions on the Peninsula, particularly by encouraging dialogue and addressing security and humanitarian concerns such as reported food shortages in North Korea. In all three countries, they met senior government officials, diplomats, UN representatives, humanitarian agencies, researchers, think tanks and North Korean refugees who fled to South Korea. Throughout the visit they made it clear that they were acting independently and did not intend "to replace or intervene in any official process".

In a report released following the Elders' visit, Jimmy Carter stated: "On relations between North and South Korea, there are no quick fixes...and progress will require greater flexibility, sincerity and commitment from all parties". Martti Ahtisaari and Gro Harlem Brundtland later travelled to Brussels to brief senior European Union officials on their findings.

==== Sudan and South Sudan ====
Peace in Sudan became a top priority for The Elders as soon as the group was founded. Indeed, The Elders' first mission was to Sudan, from 30 September to 4 October 2007. Desmond Tutu, Lakhdar Brahimi, Jimmy Carter and Graça Machel travelled to the country to learn more about the humanitarian situation in Darfur and to affirm the group's support for the Comprehensive Peace Agreement (CPA), which was negotiated between North and South Sudan in 2005 to end its 22-year civil war. The Elders published a report on their findings titled 'Bringing Hope, Forging Peace: The Elders' Mission to Sudan'.

In 2008, the Elders encouraged states to provide urgently needed helicopters for peacekeepers in Darfur. In March 2009 the Elders called for aid agencies to be given access to Sudan following their expulsion by the Sudanese government.

Ahead of South Sudan's self-determination referendum in January 2011, The Elders warned of a risk of renewed violence in Sudan and urged 'swift and bold action' by the international community in support of the peace process. Particularly, Jimmy Carter and Kofi Annan led the Carter Center delegation to observe the referendum on self-determination in South Sudan.

In 2012, prompted by the "worsening relations between Sudan and South Sudan, deteriorating economic conditions in both countries, and renewed conflict in the Sudanese states of Blue Nile and South Kordofan", The Elders decided to make a series of visits to Sudan, South Sudan and Ethiopia. They aimed to highlight the growing humanitarian crisis and encourage further peace talks between the governments of Sudan and South Sudan. In May 2012, Lakhdar Brahimi and Jimmy Carter met Sudanese President Omar al-Bashir in Khartoum. In July 2012, Martti Ahtisaari, Mary Robinson and Desmond Tutu travelled to South Sudan to meet President Salva Kiir and civil society representatives, and to visit Yusuf Batil refugee camp near the border with Sudan. They also travelled to Ethiopia, where they met Hailemariam Desalegn and members of the African Union High-Level Implementation Panel on Sudan (AUHIP), including Thabo Mbeki and Pierre Buyoya. At the conclusion of their visit, Ahtisaari, Tutu and Robinson urged presidents Bashir and Kiir to meet as soon as possible and recommit to peace. Desmond Tutu stated: "Peace, peace, peace is what the people of Sudan and South Sudan need most. Recent months have seen increased hardship and suffering in both countries. It is a fragile time and I hope that the leaders will do what their people need, which is to recommit to working together to build two viable states."

==== Sri Lanka ====
The Elders have closely followed developments in Sri Lanka and spoken out on several occasions since the end of the decades-long conflict in 2009. Particularly, The Elders have persistently emphasised the importance of achieving reconciliation and accountability for violations committed during the conflict.

In November 2009, the Elders wrote to Sri Lankan President Rajapaksa as well as major donors, calling on the government to protect the rights of displaced civilians following years of war. Desmond Tutu said the government had "an obligation to serve all Sri Lanka's citizens – including the Tamil and other minority communities".

In August 2010, The Elders expressed disappointment at the Sri Lankan government's clampdown on domestic critics and "disdain for human rights". The Elders added that meaningful progress on reconciliation on the island was still "desperately needed".

In February 2012, Mary Robinson and Desmond Tutu wrote an op-ed in The Guardian, urging the member states of the United Nations Human Rights Council "to support a resolution that seeks accountability for the terrible violations of international law that have taken place, and establishes mechanisms to monitor progress on the steps the government is taking on accountability". The U.S.-backed resolution on 'Promoting reconciliation and accountability in Sri Lanka' was adopted by the Council on 22 March 2012. Robinson and Tutu wrote a further op-ed published in The Times, The Times of India and the Tribune de Genève in March 2013, calling on the Council and the Commonwealth to exert pressure on Sri Lanka's government to implement the recommendations of the Lessons Learnt and Reconciliation Commission (LLRC).

=== Other activities ===
The organisation has also issued statements on a range of topics including those relating to Tibet, Pakistan, Norway, the International Criminal Court, and the Millennium Development Goals.

==== Kenya ====
Widespread violence erupted in Kenya in December 2007, following disputes over the results of national elections. In January 2008, the African Union established a Panel of Eminent African Personalities to mediate a solution to the crisis, headed by Kofi Annan and including Graça Machel and former Tanzanian Prime Minister Benjamin Mkapa. Earlier, the Kenyan churches had launched an unsuccessful mediation attempt headed by South African Archbishop and Elders chair, Desmond Tutu. While three Elders were involved in efforts to resolve Kenya's crisis, this was not an initiative of The Elders. The Elders issued a brief statement in January 2008 calling for an end to the violence.

==== Middle East and North Africa ====
Following major demonstrations across the Middle East and North Africa in 2011, The Elders stated that they stood in solidarity with "all those crying out for freedom and basic rights". In an interview with CNN, Desmond Tutu called on the international community to bring pressure to bear on Muammar Gaddafi to relinquish power.

In November 2011, a few weeks after elections to Tunisia's Constituent Assembly, Martti Ahtisaari, Mary Robinson and Lakhdar Brahimi travelled to Tunis to attend the annual gathering of the Mo Ibrahim Foundation. In an interview with the BBC following her meeting with Tunisian bloggers, Mary Robinson described the "sense of buoyant democracy" in the country.

Gro Harlem Brundtland, Jimmy Carter and Mary Robinson travelled to Cairo in October 2012. During their meetings with President Mohamed Morsi, senior officials and diplomats, representatives of civil society organisations and young people, the Elders emphasised the importance of "an inclusive, democratic transition."

Brundtland and Carter both visited Egypt earlier in 2012, where they met civil society organisations and spoke to students at the American University in Cairo. Carter also travelled to Egypt with the Carter Center to witness the country's presidential and parliamentary elections in January and May 2012.

Outside of their role as Elders, Kofi Annan and Lakhdar Brahimi have individually been involved in the international efforts to try to resolve the conflict in Syria. In February 2012, Annan was appointed Joint Special Envoy of the United Nations and League of Arab States on the Syrian Civil War. He was succeeded in the role by Brahimi, who was appointed Joint Special Representative in August 2012, a position he held until May 2014.

==== Russia ====
The Elders held a three-day visit to Moscow in April 2015. Kofi Annan, Gro Harlem Brundtland, Martti Ahtisaari, Lakhdar Brahimi, Jimmy Carter and Ernesto Zedillo held talks on geopolitical issues with Russian officials, including President Putin, Foreign Minister Lavrov and former Soviet President Mikhail Gorbachev.

=== State of Hope ===
In July 2021, The Elders launched the "State of Hope" series of digital discussions to explore significant global challenges.

Mary Robinson, Graça Machel, Juan Manuel Santos, Ban Ki-moon and Zeid Raad Al Hussein delivered online addresses on the relationship between hope, peace, justice, human rights and multilateralism. Their speeches were complemented by video responses from selected global figures including former UK Prime Minister Gordon Brown, NASA astronaut Chris Hadfield and Ugandan climate activist Vanessa Nakate.

=== Finding Humanity podcasts ===
During the initial phase of the COVID-19 pandemic, The Elders produced a special podcast series called "Finding Humanity", focusing on the need for empathetic and principled leadership on some of the biggest challenges facing humanity.

In episodes broadcast from 2020 to 2021, topics included pandemic preparedness, access to justice, ending violence against women and girls, reform of the UN Security Council, and the existential threat posed by nuclear weapons.

The Finding Humanity series was produced by the Humanity Lab Foundation and Hueman Group Media in partnership with The Elders, and was hosted by Hazami Barmada, Founder of the Humanity Lab Foundation.

==== #WalkTogether ====
In 2017, together with civil society partners, The Elders marked their 10th anniversary by launching #WalkTogether, a year-long global campaign aimed at inspiring hope and bridging the deepening global fault lines of division, hate and xenophobia. The campaign is intended to celebrate those communities whose work demonstrates empathy, where their actions benefit 'the many', create a sense of unity, and address global and local challenges in a compassionate way. #WalkTogether aims to lift the voices of courageous moral leadership in communities around the world, who are working for the freedoms aligned to those to which Nelson Mandela dedicated his life. These freedoms include the broad themes of peace, health, justice and equality.

The campaign ran for twelve months from 18 July 2017 – the tenth anniversary of the group's founding – to 18 July 2018, the centenary of Nelson Mandela's birth.

==== Every Human Has Rights ====
The Every Human Has Rights (EHHR) campaign was launched on the 60th anniversary of the Universal Declaration of Human Rights (UDHR), 10 December 2007, in Cape Town, South Africa. The Elders launched the initiative in partnership with a diverse group of global NGOs, civil society organisations and businesses to highlight UDHR principles, including the right to health, women's rights, and freedom of expression. Launch partners included ActionAid, Amnesty International, the Center for Women's Global Leadership, International PEN, WITNESS, Realizing Rights, Save the Children and UNICEF. The EHHR campaign also included partners from civil society organisations in the developing world through networks like CIVICUS. The campaign aimed to "empower global citizens to protect and realize the first-ever comprehensive agreement on human rights among nations". Throughout the campaign, over one billion people signed the Universal Declaration, taking responsibility and pledging to speak to protect the freedom and the rights of others in their communities.

A year later, in December 2008, The Elders joined award-winning human rights journalists, leaders in civil society, and business and government leaders to celebrate the Every Human Has Rights campaign and participate in the EHHR Media Awards.
