= Gérard Mestrallet =

French businessman (born 1949)

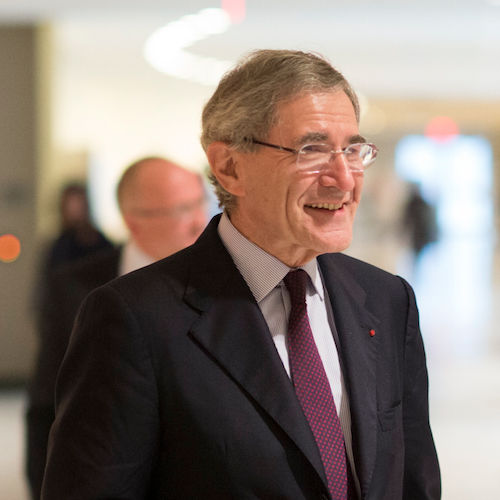
- Born: 1 April 1949 (age 77); Paris, France
- Education: Sciences Po Toulouse, École Polytechnique, École nationale de l'aviation civile, ÉNA
- Occupation: CEO of Engie (2008-2016)

Gérard Mestrallet (French pronunciation: [ʒeʁaʁ mɛstʁalɛ], born 1 April 1949) is a French manager who was chairman and CEO of Engie 2008 to 2016. He is also the chairman of Suez.

== Early life and education ==
Mestrallet was born in Paris on 1 April 1949. He received degrees from Sciences Po Toulouse, the École Polytechnique, École nationale de l'aviation civile and the École nationale d'administration.

== Career ==
=== Career in government ===
After his studies, Mestrallet joined the Treasury. From September 1982 and July 1984 he was the technical advisor in charge of industrial affairs under the Minister of Economics and Finance (during the tenure of Jacques Delors)

=== Career in the energy sector ===
In 1984, Mestrallet started working as a special advisor for Suez. He has been its Chairman and CEO since 2001. He was named Deputy Delegate General for Industrial Affairs in June 1986. In July 1987, he was General Director of the European Court of Human Rights, an affiliate of the Compagnie financière de Suez. In January 1991 he started as the Deputy Director General of the company, but a month later he became the Managing Director and Chairman of the Management Committee of the Société General de Belgique.

In 1995 Mestrallet took a position as the head of Suez and from then he worked for Suez while focusing on three businesses: energy, water, and waste He fostered the reconciliation between Suez and the Lyonnaise des Eaux. The Suez-Lyonnaise des Eaux was started in 1997, at which time Mestrallet became the chairman of its executive board while Jérôme Monod, chairman of Lyonnaise, became the Chairman of the Supervisory Board. However, the group soon went back to its original name, Suez and in 2003 its leaders made a proposition to shareholders to change the association of the company by becoming an LP with a board of directors and Gerard Mestrallet as the CEO.

In July 2008, Mestrallet was appointed CEO of GDF Suez (later Engie). Upon merging Gaz de France and Suez to create a new European energy company, he spent about 4 billion euros ($5.6 billion) in a series of targeted acquisitions across the globe by late 2008. He also set a target for the group of investing 10 billion euros a year over the period from 2009 until 2011.

In 2012, GDF Suez's board of directors extended the age limit for the group's chairman and chief executive to 67 from 65, a step that enabled Mestrallet to extend his tenure.

On 3 May 2016, Mestrallet left his position due to statutory age limits and instead became chairman of the board of directors of the group, with Isabelle Kocher appointed as CEO, as planned for months.

=== Controversy ===
In 2014, France's Autorité de la concurrence ordered GDF Suez to share a set of customer data with competitors while pursuing an investigation into alleged abuse of a dominant position by GDF Suez.

Also in 2014, Mestrallet's retirement cap of 21 million euros was a controversy in the media due to GDF Suez's record losses for 2013 and its effort to prepare a savings plan. In 2016, Engie announced that Mestrallet's 350,000 euro salary would go to the Engie Foundation charity and that he would carry out his role for free.

== Later career ==
In 2016, Mestrallet was appointed by Minister of Ecology Ségolène Royal to chair a three-member advisory committee to review European carbon pricing and make recommendations to the French government. Under his leadership, the committee recommended that France increase taxation on coal-fired power plants, or set stricter carbon emissions standards, to encourage a shift to gas-fired plants to reduce carbon emissions.

In 2018, Mestrallet was appointed by President Emmanuel Macron as Executive Chairman of the French Agency for the Development of Al-ʿUla in Saudi Arabia, a French organization in charge of tourism and cultural development in the area in cooperation with the Saudi Kingdom.

== Other activities ==
=== Corporate boards ===
- Saudi Electricity Company, Member of the Board of Directors (since 2018)
- Société Générale, Independent Member of the Board of Directors (since 2015)
- JP Morgan Chase, Member of the External Advisory Council on the AdvancingCities Initiative
- Suez Environnement, Chairman of the Board of Directors (-2019)
- JPMorgan Chase, Member of the International Council (-2017)
- Engie, Chairman of the Board of Directors (2016-2018)
- Siemens, Member of the Supervisory Board (2013-2018)
- International Power, Member of the Board of Directors (2011-2016)
- Electrabel, Chairman of the Board of Directors (2010-2016)
- Aguas de Barcelona, Vice-Chairman of the Board of Directors (2010-2015)
- Pargesa Holding S.A., Member of the Board of Directors (1998-2014)
- Saint-Gobain, Member of the Board of Directors (1995-2015)

=== Non-profit organizations ===
- Carbon Pricing Leadership Coalition (CPLC), Co-Chair (since 2015)
- European Round Table of Industrialists (ERT), Member
- France China Foundation, Member of the Strategic Committee
- Paris School of International Affairs (PSIA), Member of the Strategic Committee
- Institut de l'entreprise, Member of the Board and Advisory Council
- President of the Mayor's Council of Chongqing (since 2006)
- Member of the Mayor's Council of Shanghai
- Mayor of Beijing's International Business Leaders Advisory Council (IBLAC), Member
- Member of the Council of International Advisers to the Hong Kong government (1998-2005)
- Tongji University, Member of the Board of Trustees
- Paris Europlace, President of the Policy Board (since 2003)
- French Institute of Administrators, Member of the Council
- Fondation Agir Contre l'Exclusion (FACE), President

== Compensation ==
Mestrallet reached 3,005,079 in remuneration in 2012 (down 2.7% from 2011). It was the tenth compensation from SBF 120 and the eighth from CAC 40.

In May 2016, Engie announced that Gérard Mestrallet's 350,000 euro chairman salary will go to the Engie foundation charity and that he will carry out his new job for free.

== Awards ==
Mestrallet is Commander of the National Order of the Legion of Honour and is a Knight of the National Order of Merit.

== Personal life ==
Mestrallet is the son of Georges Mestrallet and Paule Mestrallet-Besnard. He has two brothers, Michael and Patrick Mestrallet. He married Joëlle Emillienne Renée Arcens in 1974 and has three children.

Business positions
Preceded by None	CEO of Engie; 2008–2016	Succeeded by Isabelle Kocher
