= Isabelle Kocher =

French businesswoman (born 1966)

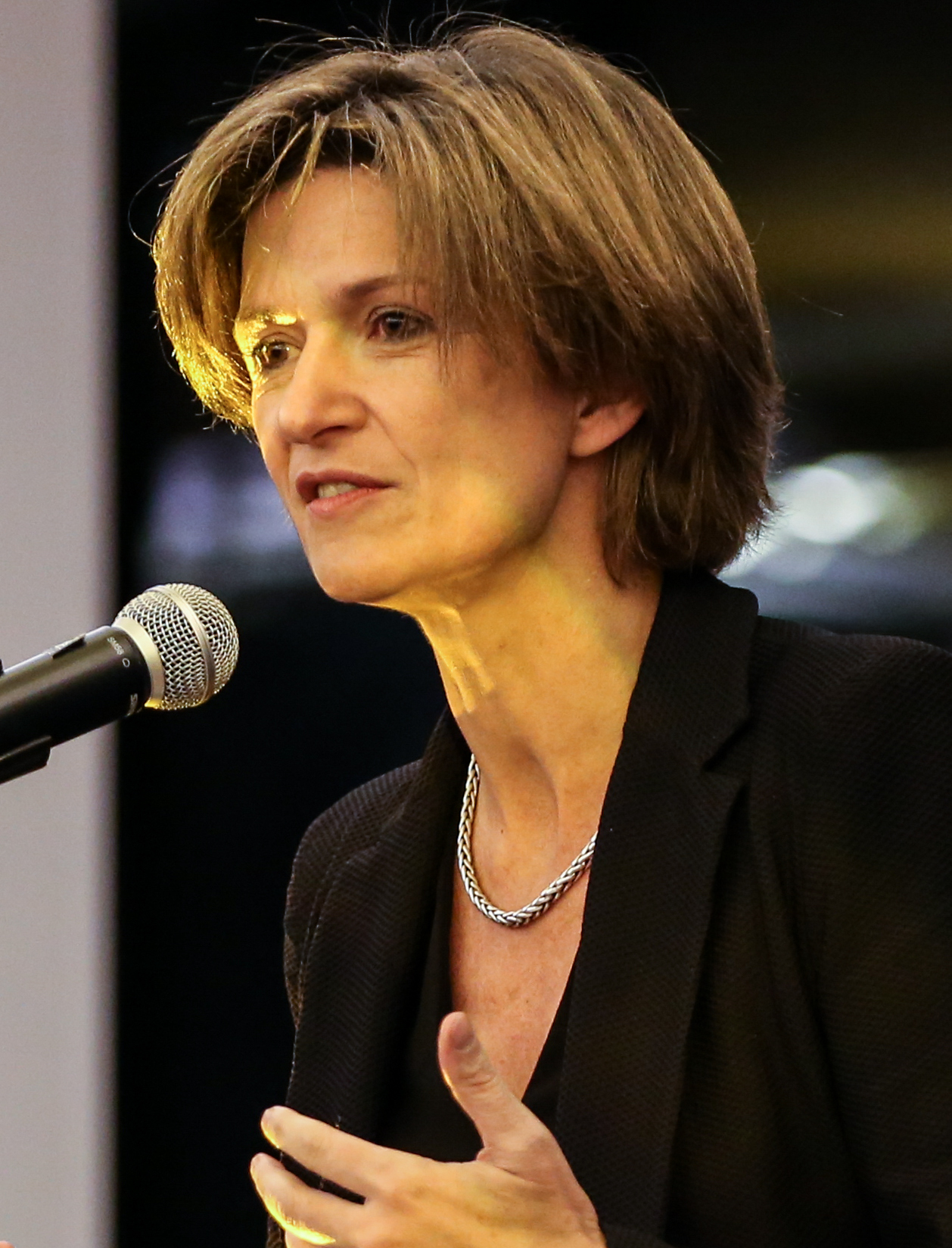
- Isabelle Kocher in 2018
- Born: Isabelle Thabut; 9 December 1966 (age 59); Neuilly-sur-Seine, France
- Education: Lycée Janson-de-Sailly
- Alma mater: École normale supérieure Mines ParisTech
- Occupation: Former CEO of Engie
- Children: 5

Isabelle Kocher (née: Thabut; born 9 December 1966) is a French businesswoman. She was the chief executive officer of Engie (previously GDF Suez) until February 2020.

== Early life and education ==
Isabelle Kocher graduated from the École normale supérieure in Paris in 1987 and Mines ParisTech engineering school. She also holds a master's degree in quantum optics and a postgraduate certificate in physics.

== Career ==
=== Public sector ===
From 1997 to 1999, Kocher was director of the postal and telecommunication budgets, followed by the defense budget at the French Budget Department. Between 1999 and 2002, she worked as industrial affairs advisor at the office of French prime minister Lionel Jospin.

=== Private sector ===
She joined the Suez company in 2002 and held functional and operational positions. She was running its French water operations when it became GDF Suez in 2008. Kocher was then elevated to finance director and operations director.

She was appointed in 2011 as chief financial officer of GDF Suez. Between October 2014 and April 2016, she served as deputy CEO and chief operating officer.

=== CEO of Engie, 2016–2020 ===
On 3 May 2016 Kocher was appointed CEO of Engie, replacing Gérard Mestrallet. She became the only woman CEO in the CAC 40 index.

Since becoming CEO, Isabelle Kocher initiated a strategic shift at Engie aimed at repositioning the company within the global energy sector. She emphasized the need for Engie to respond to climate change by transitioning toward a decarbonized, partially decentralized, and digitalized energy model, with the goal of increasing access to energy, including in developing regions.

To implement this vision, Kocher reorganized the company to reduce management layers and improve agility, supported by a €300 million employee training plan. Engie also sold 20% of its assets—valued at €15 billion, notably in coal—and reinvested in renewable and decentralized energy. Additionally, €1.5 billion was earmarked for digital technologies and innovation by the end of 2018.

Additionally, Kocher prioritized diversity and internationalization within the company. Under her leadership, Engie set targets to increase female representation, aiming for women to hold at least 25% of executive roles and 35% of high-potential positions.

Kocher campaigned in 2018 to take on the chairman’s role when Mestrallet retired, but lost out after the government supported Jean-Pierre Clamadieu instead.

In 2019, after having invested €15 billion in new activities, Kocher announced the definitive exit of coal activities and a new strategic plan for the years 2019-2021. Her plan is to specialize in high value-added services and in renewable energies. She planned to invest another €12 billion in these activities, partly financed by the sale of €6 billion assets (including the last coal plants). She also announced her intention to leave 20 of the 70 countries where Engie is active, and focus the group's activities on 20 countries and 30 metropolitan areas, mainly in Southeast Asia and Africa.

By the end of 2019, Kocher came under pressure amid reports of a strategy split within the group and disagreements between board members on whether to pursue a sell-off of some gas assets. She subsequently failed to get state backing to serve another term.

On 6 February 2020 it was announced that her mandate as CEO would not be renewed and that new leadership was needed at the head of Engie.

=== Since 2020 ===
In 2021, she co-founded Blunomy, a company focused on supporting the energy transition and decarbonization strategies, where she serves as Executive Chair.

== Other positions ==
She is member of the board of Suez, Axa, International Power and Investor AB. She is chairman of Terrawatt Initiative, a global non profit-organization designed to implement a new global energy mix along 3 axes:

- deploying modern technologies to replace the old power grids, incapable of handling a significant increase in renewable energy
- providing for the world’s needs in energy in developing countries, by deploying new renewable assets
- withdrawing from fossil energy in developed countries, by replacing old assets with clean and renewable energy.

Terrawatt's goal is to present ready-to-implement propositions at COP 23.

She joined the board of Investor AB in 2021 and is involved in various organizations including EGIS, Le Cercle des Économistes, RAISE, and The B Team.

== Recognition ==
Kocher is a knight of the Legion of Honor and a knight of the French National Order of Merit.

In September 2017, she was ranked third in Fortune's international list of most powerful women.

== Personal life ==
Kocher is divorced and has five children.

Business positions
Preceded by Gérard Mestrallet	CEO of Engie; 2016–present	Succeeded by Incumbent
