= Derek Handley =

New Zealand entrepreneur

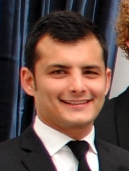
- Handley in 2011
- Born: 1978 (age 47–48); Hong Kong
- Citizenship: New Zealand
- Occupations: Entrepreneur, speaker, author

Derek Handley (born 1978) is a New Zealand entrepreneur, author, investor, and philanthropist. He is the founder of the Aera Foundation, a charitable trust focused on supporting responses to social and environmental challenges, and a co-founder of The B Team, a global business initiative established with Richard Branson.

Handley has worked across technology, entrepreneurship, venture capital, philanthropy, sustainability, and social enterprise. His more recent work has included Aera Foundation, Aera VC, projects concerning sustainable tourism and climate, and initiatives focused on home ownership. He has also written books on entrepreneurship and personal development and studied religion and philosophy at Harvard University.

== Career ==
Handley began his career in the technology sector before becoming involved in business, investment, and philanthropic initiatives. In 2013, he co-founded The B Team with British entrepreneur Richard Branson. The organization was established to promote responsible business practices and sustainable economic development.

He later focused much of his work on philanthropy, climate, and social enterprise. He established the Aera Foundation, a charitable trust supporting social and environmental projects through initiatives with ten-, one-hundred-, and one-thousand-year time horizons. His work through the foundation has included projects related to sustainability, creative practice, and long-term thinking. He also chaired the New Zealand campaign for Travalyst, a sustainable travel initiative founded by Prince Harry.

Handley was also the co-founder of Paererewa, a long-term public art and community project centered on a bench conceived with a 1,000-year perspective. The project was developed through the Aera Foundation and was covered by New Zealand arts and architecture publications.

=== Chief Technology Officer of New Zealand ===
Handley's application for the governmental role of Chief Technology Officer (CTO) of New Zealand became a political controversy when he applied in 2018. The role was to be created under the auspices of Government Digital Services Minister Clare Curran. On 24 August 2018, New Zealand Prime Minister Jacinda Ardern dismissed Curran from the Cabinet after it became clear Curran had met Handley in February at her Beehive office to discuss his interest in the vacant CTO role. Curran had failed to disclose the meeting in her ministerial diary and to inform staff or officials about it (the second meeting she had failed to disclose). Curran apologised to the Prime Minister for her actions and eventually resigned as a Minister.

In September 2018, Handley announced that he had been offered, and had accepted, the CTO role in August. Soon after, the Government announced that it would not be proceeding with the role and paid Handley compensation of $107,000 (three months' pay plus reimbursement for moving costs). Handley said he was "deeply disappointed" by the process but the Government's decision to halt it was understandable due to the concerns raised. Later, Prime Minister Jacinda Ardern formally apologized to Handley.

=== Entrepreneurship ===
Handley founded Aera VC, a venture capital fund focused on deep technology and climate-related ventures. He later founded Aera New Zealand, a venture focused on home ownership and assisting prospective first-home buyers. He serves as its chief executive officer.

=== Academia and philosophy ===
Handley's later work has addressed philosophy, spirituality, and psychology. During the COVID-19 pandemic, he created and hosted the podcast Wiser Conversations, featuring discussions with guests including Naomi Klein, Sri Sri Ravi Shankar, Priya Parker, Pico Iyer, Susan David, Shefali Tsabary, and Sasha Sagan.

He earned a Master of Liberal Arts degree in religion from Harvard University. His thesis examined the relationship between the Hindu concept of nishkama karma and peak athletic performance.

He was appointed an Adjunct Professor at Auckland University of Technology (AUT).

== Writing ==
He is the author of two books. His first book, Heart to Start, published by Penguin New Zealand, which discusses entrepreneurship, personal purpose and his experiences as an entrepreneur.

In 2025, Handley co-authored The Fastest Way to Your First Home with Karl Fleet. The book focuses on strategies for first-home buyers in New Zealand and is associated with his work at Aera NZ.

== Public service ==
In 2018, Handley was selected by New Zealand Prime Minister Jacinda Ardern for the position of Government Chief Technology Officer. The appointment process subsequently became the subject of controversy and was withdrawn. Prime Minister Ardern later apologised over the handling of the recruitment process. The circumstances surrounding the appointment and its withdrawal were reported by New Zealand media.

== Philanthropy ==
Through the Aera Foundation, Handley has supported projects involving environmental issues, technology, culture, and long-term social development. In 2013, he was instrumental in establishing Boosted, New Zealand’s national arts crowdfunding platform, serving as its founding chair. The platform has raised more than NZ$17 million for arts projects.

== Awards and honours ==
In September 2006, Handley was a finalist in the Bayer Innovator Awards (Information Technology and Communications Category).

In October 2009, he received the 2009 EY Young Entrepreneur of the Year Award.

In December 2010, he was named finalist for the New Zealand Herald Business Leader of the Year.

In October 2011, he was listed on the 'Silicon Alley 100' of the most influential technology people in New York. That same year he was named a New Zealand 2011 Sir Peter Blake Leader by the Sir Peter Blake Trust, and became a World Class New Zealander.

In March 2015, he was named one of 100 visionary leaders by the Young Presidents' Organization, a global network of business leaders who have achieved success at an early age.

In April 2015, he was year named a Distinguished Young Alumni of Victoria University of Wellington (Wellington, New Zealand).

In September 2015, he was named in the world's top 100 influential leaders by the Association to Advance Collegiate Schools of Business, a global accrediting body and membership association for business schools.

In November 2015, he was named one of the top 10 most influential social entrepreneurs on Twitter (by Chivas' The Venture, US).

In November 2016, the Wharton Social Impact Initiative, at Wharton School of the University of Pennsylvania invited Handley to join the David Nazarian Social Innovator in Residence Program, naming him the third "Innovator in Residence" to visit the school.

== Personal life ==
Handley has a son with his wife, Maya. During the process of applying for the Chief Technology Officer position, he moved his family back to New Zealand to live in Auckland.

In November 2017, Handley was granted New Zealand citizenship by the Minister for Internal Affairs, Tracey Martin, under the "exceptional circumstances" provision. The provision was required because he had not spent enough time in New Zealand to meet the usual requirements to become a citizen, since he was 865 days short. Handley argued that he did not meet the requirements because he frequently travelled for business.
