= Jeremy Coller =

British businessman and philanthropist (born 1958)

- Born: 17 May 1958 (age 68); London, England
- Education: Manchester University; University of Sussex
- Occupation: Businessman
- Known for: Founder of Coller Capital and the FAIRR Initiative; Head and CIO of Coller EQT
- Website: Jeremy Coller Foundation

Jeremy Coller (born 17 May 1958) is a British businessman and philanthropist. He is the founder of Coller Capital and, since its acquisition by EQT AB in August 2026, Head and Chief Investment Officer of Coller EQT.

Coller chairs the Jeremy Coller Foundation and is a deputy chair of Tel Aviv University, where he is on the advisory board of the Coller School of Management, and is the founder and primary sponsor of the annual Coller Startup Competition, helping to fund early-stage startups.

Coller is known for his philanthropic work in animal welfare and for founding the FAIRR Initiative, an investor network addressing ESG risks in food and agriculture. In 2026, the Sunday Times Rich List estimated Coller’s wealth at £2 billion.

== Early life ==
Coller was born in London on 17 May 1958.

He attended Carmel College and holds a master's degree in philosophy from the University of Sussex and a BSc in management sciences from Manchester University. He took the Diplome Cours de Civilisation at the Sorbonne in Paris.

After building a career in private equity, Coller was awarded an honorary fellowship by London Business School in 2011 and in 2013, received an honorary doctorate from Tel Aviv University.

== Business career ==
Coller began his financial career in equity research at Fidelity International. He joined the ICI Pension Plan as a sector fund manager before moving into venture and buyout investment roles. During this period, he was an early proponent of investing in secondary positions in private equity funds.

According to Secondaries Investor, at ICI Coller became the first institutional investor in Dayton Carr’s VCFA fund, an early private equity secondaries vehicle.

In 1990, Coller founded Coller Capital, one of the earliest firms in Europe dedicated to secondary private equity investments. The firm has since expanded internationally and raised multiple large secondaries funds, completing transactions involving portfolios of private equity interests and corporate divestments from companies such as BT, Lucent Bell Labs, and the UK Atomic Energy Authority. In 2021, it closed its eighth core fund, Coller International Partners VIII, with over $9 billion in commitments. In 2022, it raised $1.4 billion for its Coller Credit Opportunities I fund, marking the firm’s entry into credit secondaries. In 2025, the firm raised $6.8 billion for its Coller Credit Opportunities II fund. As of 2025, Coller Capital employed 272 people and operated offices in London, New York, Hong Kong, Seoul and other locations.

In January 2026, Coller agreed to sell Coller Capital to Swedish private equity group EQT in a deal valued at up to $3.7 billion. The transaction completed on 31 August 2026, with the business rebranded as Coller EQT and reported as a new Secondaries segment within EQT. Coller became Head and Chief Investment Officer of Coller EQT and joined EQT's executive committee.

== Philanthropy ==
In 2026, Coller was ranked 20th in The Sunday Times Giving List, which ranks philanthropists by the proportion of their wealth donated or pledged to charitable causes.

Coller is founder and chairman of the Jeremy Coller Foundation, a UK-based grant-making organisation that supports work in areas including global food system reform, animal welfare, alternative proteins and food tech, and innovation in venture and management education. In 2025 he contributed £21.7 million to the Foundation, following similar donations in earlier years.

Between 2012 and 2024, he was on the advisory council of The Elders, a peace and human rights organisation founded by Nelson Mandela.

=== Interspecies communication ===
In 2020, the Foundation established the Coller Prize for Interspecies Conversation, a $1 million award supporting research into communication between humans and animals, including through the use of artificial intelligence.

In 2025, the Foundation launched the Coller Dolittle Challenge with Tel Aviv University, offering $100,000 annual prizes and a final $10 million equity award (or $500,000 in cash) for achieving two-way interspecies communication. The Challenge draws inspiration from the Turing Test and has recognised a dolphin vocalisations project with its first annual award. In 2026, The Observer described the initiative as an 'ethical moonshot', noting that Coller had compared the challenge to deciphering the Rosetta Stone.

The 2026 prize was awarded to Julie Elie of the University of California, Berkeley, for her work on zebra finch communication.

=== ESG investing and corporate engagement ===
The Jeremy Coller Foundation funds research and advocacy on the consequences of factory farming for global sustainability.

==== FAIRR (Farm Animal Investment Risk & Return) Initiative ====
In 2015, Coller founded the FAIRR Initiative (Farm Animal Investment Risk & Return), a global network of institutional investors focused on ESG risks in intensive animal agriculture. As of 2025, its members represented over $80 trillion in assets.

FAIRR engages with global food companies to influence corporate practices related to antibiotic use, climate resilience, animal welfare, Scope 3 emissions, and sustainability reporting.

In 2022, Coller co-founded the Alternative Proteins Association, a UK-based trade body representing companies involved in plant-based, cultivated, and fermented proteins. The association promotes regulatory reform, industry collaboration and public policy support for alternative proteins, aiming to accelerate the transition to more sustainable food systems.

=== Research, advocacy and public engagement ===
The Foundation funds complementary public health research, including epidemiological studies on antimicrobial resistance linked to intensive farming.

In 2025, the Foundation donated £4 million to create the Jeremy Coller Centre for Animal Sentience at the London School of Economics. It funds interdisciplinary research into animal minds, emotions, and welfare using approaches from neuroscience, philosophy, law, and behavioural science.

In 2021, The Foundation launched the Coller Animal Law Forum (CALF), which tracks and analyses global farm animal legislation and provides guidance for policymakers and advocates.

In 2023, Coller authored An Ever-Green Revolution, a white paper outlining the unintended consequences of the “Green Revolution” including accelerating intensive animal agriculture and contributing to AMR.

The Foundation is also the principal funder of the Future of Food exhibition at the Science Museum, London. The exhibition covers emerging food technologies and industrial agriculture’s effects on sustainability and health.

=== Educational initiatives ===
In 2008, the Foundation donated to London Business School to create the Coller Institute of Private Equity, which conducted industry research and published the Private Equity Findings digest until 2016, when publishing was taken over by Coller Capital.

In 2013, as part of a $50 million donation to Tel Aviv University, the Foundation launched the Coller Institute of Venture – a programme promoting global venture ecosystems through policy research, innovation strategy, and support for university–industry commercialisation. It issued the annual Coller Venture Review.

In 2016, the Foundation’s donation led to Tel Aviv University’s business school being renamed as the Coller School of Management. This funding supported faculty recruitment, increased research capacity, globalisation of the student body, and established the Coller Startup Competition, which awards $100,000 annually to companies innovating in alternative food systems.

=== Global pension reform ===
In 2025, Coller established the Coller Pensions Institute, a non-profit think tank focused on pension policy research. The Institute examines pension system alignment with UN Sustainable Development Goals, including issues of ageing populations, ESG investing, and pension access in emerging economies.

In February 2026, the Institute published research examining pension coverage among informal and gig-economy workers globally. The report highlighted low participation rates among informal workers and argued that without structural reform, ageing populations and limited retirement savings could pose long-term economic and fiscal challenges. It set out a series of policy recommendations aimed at expanding access to retirement savings in emerging and developed economies.

== Honours and awards ==
Coller has been included in private equity industry rankings published by Financial News, Business Insider, and Private Equity News.

Coller has been profiled extensively in specialist private-equity publications. Private Equity News has described him as “the Godfather of Secondaries”, reflecting his influence on the development of the secondaries market. In 2023, the industry outlet SecondaryLink reported the results of a reader poll naming him the “GOAT of the secondary market”. In 2026, Coller was inducted into the Real Deals Private Equity Awards Hall of Fame.

In 2008, he was named Outstanding Alumnus by the University of Manchester, received an Honorary Fellowship from London Business School in 2011, and an Honorary Doctorate from Tel Aviv University in 2013 for his contributions to private equity and entrepreneurship research.

== Publications ==
Coller's book Splendidly Unreasonable Inventors: The Lives, Loves, and Deaths of 30 Pioneers Who Changed the World was published in 2008 by Overlook Press (ISBN 9781590202692).
