= June 2024 Ukraine peace summit =

International summit in Switzerland

Summit on Peace in Ukraine Глобальний саміт миру (Ukrainian) Hochrangige Konferenz zum Frieden in der Ukraine (Ger.) Conférence de haut niveau sur la paix en Ukraine (French) Conferenza di alto livello sulla pace in Ucraina (Italian)
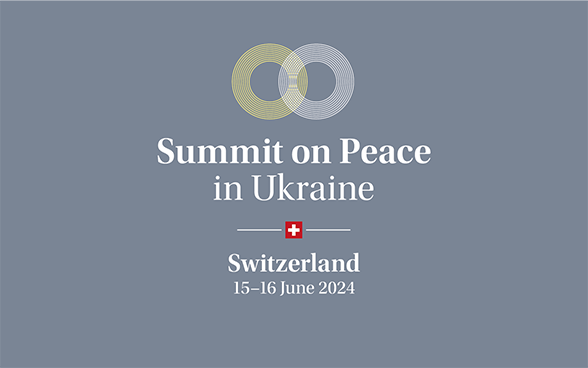

- Countries that participated and signed Communique Participated, did not sign Communique Invited countries, did not participate Not invited country (Russia)
- Host country: Switzerland
- Date: 15–16 June 2024
- City: Stansstad, Switzerland
- Venue: Bürgenstock Resort; 46°59′44″N 8°22′38″E
- Participants: 92 countries (see §) 8 organisations: Council of Europe; Ecumenical Patriarchate (obs.); European Commission; European Parliament; Organization of American States; OSCE; United Nations (observer)
- Chair: CHE; UKR
- President: Viola Amherd, President of Switzerland
- Website: Summit on Peace in Ukraine

Key points

An international peace summit in relation to the Russo-Ukrainian War, formally called the Summit on Peace in Ukraine, was held in Bürgenstock Resort in Switzerland on 15–16 June 2024. The conference followed a series of four earlier international meetings, and was hosted by the Swiss president Viola Amherd. Representatives from 92 nations and 8 international organizations attended the summit, while Russia did not participate.

The Joint Communiqué on a Peace Framework became the final statement of the summit and was supported by the majority of participants. In the Joint Communiqué, the signees declared that they agreed to take "concrete steps ... with further engagement of the representatives of all parties" on three themes: nuclear power and weapons, food security, and prisoners and deportees. The signees agreed that "Ukrainian nuclear power plants and installations, including Zaporizhzhia Nuclear Power Plant, must operate safely and securely under full sovereign control of Ukraine and in line with IAEA principles and under its supervision" and that "Any threat or use of nuclear weapons in the context of the ongoing war against Ukraine is inadmissible." They declared that for the "supply of food products ... Attacks on merchant ships in ports and along the entire route, as well as against civilian ports and civilian port infrastructure, are unacceptable" and that "Ukrainian agricultural products should be securely and freely provided to interested third countries." They stated that "all prisoners of war must be released" and that all children and "other Ukrainian civilians who were unlawfully detained, must be returned to Ukraine". Some delegates did not endorse the Joint Communiqué; as of 26 September 2024, 89 states and six organisations had signed it.

== Background ==
=== Ukrainian 10-point proposal ===
In November 2022, Ukrainian president Volodymyr Zelenskyy announced a 10-point peace plan, on the issues of nuclear safety; food security for Asian and African countries; Ukraine's energy infrastructure; the release of prisoners and the return of Ukrainian children deported to Russia; restoration of the 1991 Russia–Ukraine border; withdrawal of Russian forces from Ukraine; prosecutions for war crimes in the Russian invasion of Ukraine; handling of ecological damage; guarantees against future Russian aggression; and a peace conference and international treaty. In December 2022, Zelenskyy called for the G7 states to support the plan.

=== Series of four meetings ===
A series of four international conferences aiming at a peaceful resolution of the February 2022 Russian full-scale invasion of Ukraine preceded the planned June 2024 Swiss conference.

On 24 June 2023, the first meeting was held in Copenhagen, including representatives from Ukraine, G7 states, the European Union (EU), India, South Africa, Brazil, and Turkey, with the aim of building wide international support for a peace process based on the Ukrainian 10-point proposal. A European Commission official stated that there was emerging consensus at the meeting that the peace process should be based on the United Nations Charter principles of territorial integrity and sovereignty.

A second meeting was held during 5–6 August 2023 in Jeddah, including representatives from about 40 countries, including China, India, EU member states, India, Brazil, South Africa, Indonesia, Mexico, Zambia, Egypt and the United States (US). Agreements were made to establish working groups on the themes of the Ukrainian 10-point peace proposal and an ambassadors' group. The aim of holding a meeting at the heads-of-state level was "considered plausible" for later in 2023. Kyiv Post described the Ukriainian 10-point plan as "broadly" gaining support at the meeting.

A third meeting was organised on the weekend of 28–29 October 2023 in Malta among national security advisors from 65 states from Europe, South America, the Arab world, Africa and Asia.

A fourth meeting was held in mid-January 2024 Davos prior to the World Economic Forum, with representatives from 83 countries and international organisations participating, including 18 from Asia, without China, and 12 from Africa. Co-chair of the meeting, Swiss Foreign Minister Ignazio Cassis, stated that the meeting had "clarified points up for discussion", that neither Ukraine nor Russia accepted territorial concessions, and that a high-level meeting had not been scheduled. On 15 January, following the meeting, Swiss president Viola Amherd stated that Switzerland was planning to organise a "possible peace conference".

=== Timing ===
The summit immediately followed the 50th G7 summit in Fasano, Italy.

=== Russian proposal on the day prior to the summit ===
On 14 June, the day before the summit was held, Russian president Vladimir Putin presented a proposal in which Ukraine had to "begin the actual withdrawal of troops from the territories of Donetsk, Luhansk, Kherson and Zaporizhzhia oblasts within the administrative borders." These borders had to be "as they existed at the time of their accession to Ukraine." (Note: On 14 June 2024 Russia was not holding all these territories Putin mentioned under its military control.) Additionally, Ukraine had to "officially announce the abandonment of plans to join NATO." After these conditions had been met "from our side, immediately, literally at that same moment, the order to cease fire and begin negotiations will be issued. I repeat, we will do this immediately." Putin stated that the essence of the proposal "is not about a temporary truce. It is not about freezing the conflict but about its final resolution." Putin listed Ukraine's neutral and non-nuclear status and lifting sanctions against Russia as additional conditions for peaceful resolution. (Note: Putin also mentioned that in future peace negotiations Russia would insist on the "demilitarization and denazification" of Ukraine of which, according to Putin, the "parameters were generally agreed upon by everyone back during the Istanbul talks in 2022. Putin stated "Of course, the rights and freedoms of Russian-speaking citizens in Ukraine must be fully ensured.") Putin stated that this plan was "another real concrete peace proposal", and if turned down by Ukraine and its allies, "then this is their problem, their political and moral responsibility for continuing the bloodshed".

Zelenskyy responded the same day, stating, "These messages are ultimatum messages. It's the same thing Hitler did, when he said 'give me a part of Czechoslovakia and it'll end here'." Dutch prime minister Mark Rutte interpreted Putin's proposal as a sign of panic.

=== Chinese alternative proposal ===
In May 2024, China and Brazil made a six-point proposal calling for an international peace conference that is "recognised by both Russia and Ukraine, with equal participation of all parties as well as fair discussion of all peace plans." China did not attend the weekend summit in Switzerland, while Brazil sent a low-level delegation.

== Exploratory phase and preparations ==
=== Exploratory discussions ===
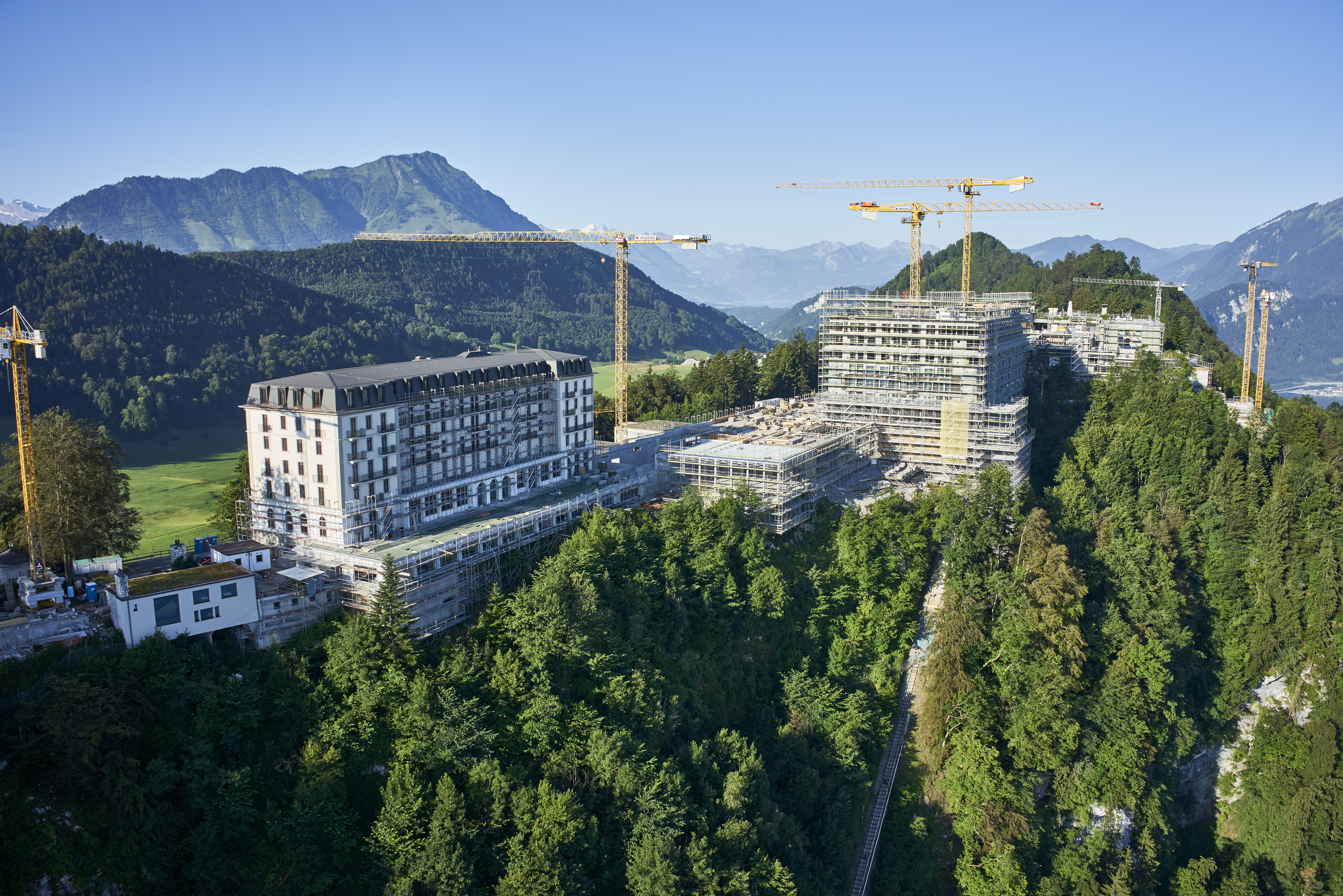
Hotels of Bürgenstock resort during rebuild in 2016

Following talks with Zelenskyy in January 2024, Swiss officials started an exploratory phase of discussions with representatives of the European Union, China, India, South Africa, Brazil, Ethiopia and Saudi Arabia in relation to a possible high-level peace conference that "builds" on the series of four national-advisor level conferences.

On 10 April 2024, the Swiss Federal Council stated that the conference would be held at Bürgenstock Resort in June 2024. Possible dates suggested for the conference were 16–17 June 2024. Swiss representatives aimed at convincing representatives from a wide variety of states to participate, with Cassis visiting China and India for this purpose.

Gabriel Lüchinger of the Swiss Federal Department of Foreign Affairs and Ignazio Cassis were responsible for groups preparing the conference.

A meeting among security and administrative officials from the G7 and unnamed countries of the Global South, without Russian representatives, was planned to be held in Qatar on the weekend of 27–28 April 2024 in preparation for the June summit.

=== Security ===
Security plans for the summit include the deployment of 4000 personnel from Swiss security forces, airspace restrictions around Bürgenstock, and Swiss Air Force deployment. According to SWI swissinfo, public access to the Bürgenstock Resort is easy to restrict. An aerodrome is nearby.

== Aims ==
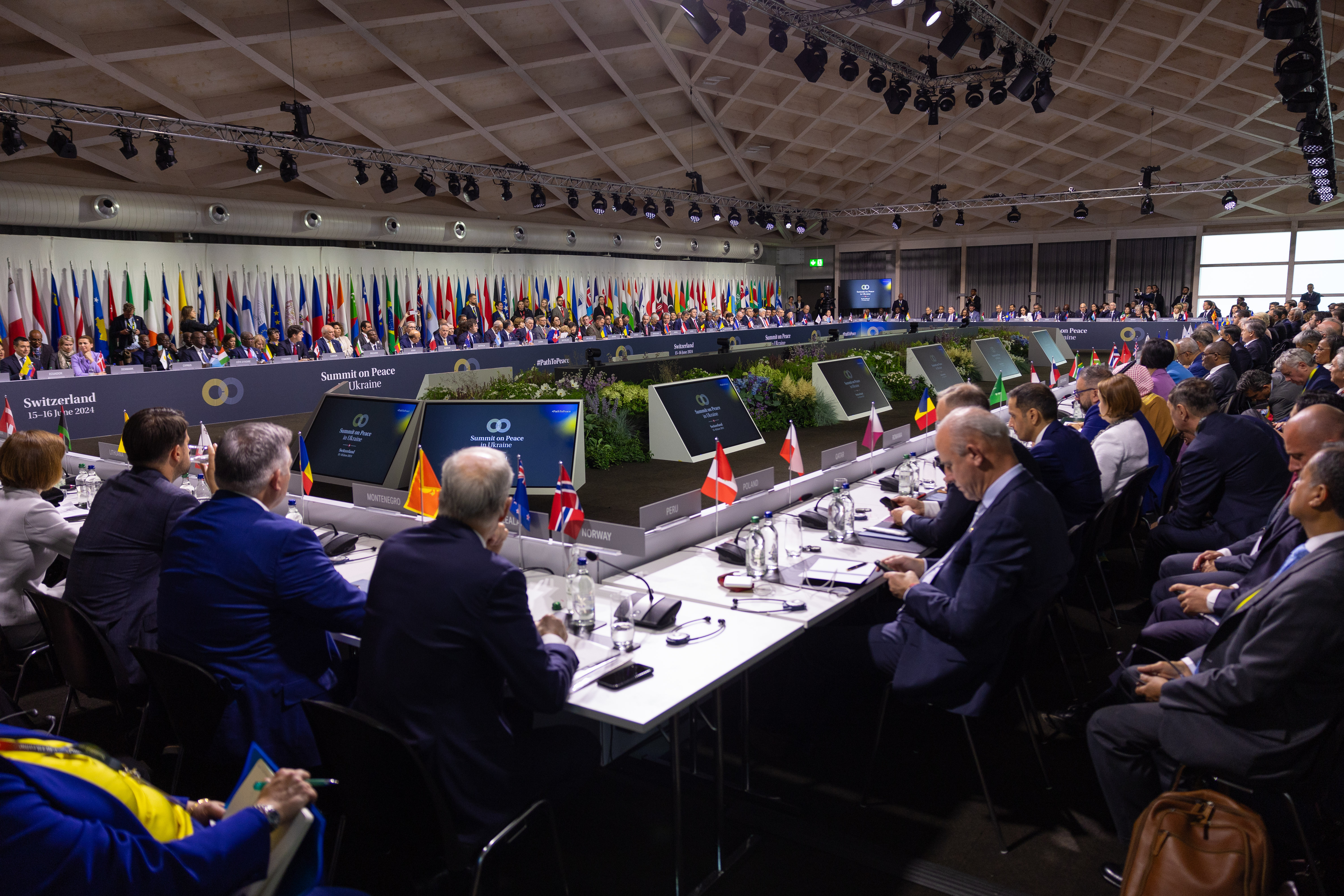
Working session in the facilities of Bürgenstock Resort in Nidwalden

The conference aims to conduct high-level discussion on a "comprehensive, just and lasting peace for Ukraine" in the context of international law and the Charter of the United Nations, and to motivate a peace process. The discussion is aimed to include "build[ing] on" earlier discussions of the Ukrainian 10-point peace proposal and "other peace proposals based on the UN Charter and key principles of international law", and to jointly develop a plan on how to include both Ukraine and Russia in a later peace process. The FDFA stated that all participating states "should be able to contribute their ideas and visions" of how to achieve peace.

As of 6 June 2024, three specific topics were seen by the FDFA as being of wide interest to participating states and likely to be the focus of the summit:

- nuclear safety and security;
- freedom of navigation and food safety; and
- humanitarian aspects including protection of civilians and prisoner exchange.

The FDFA argued that "small, concrete steps" could be taken in the three topics to build trust.

== Participating states and international organizations ==
States that: signed the Joint Communiqué participated in the summit but did not sign the Joint Communiqué

As of 24 May 2024, representatives from 160 states and international organizations had been invited to the conference. The possible participation of China was seen as a key issue. A Swiss FDFA spokesperson stated that "listen[ing] to the Global South, which [would] play a key role in the eventual inclusion of Russia in the process" was significant. The FDFA stated that ninety states and organisations had registered to take part in the summit as of 10 June 2024.

Participation included that of heads of states and governments or other representatives from Europe (Armenia, Belgium, Denmark, Finland, France, Georgia, Germany, Italy, Kosovo, Latvia, Liechtenstein, The Netherlands, Poland, Portugal, Spain), Africa (Cape Verde, Malawi), Asia (India, Japan, The Philippines, Singapore, South Korea), South America (Argentina, Chile) and North America (Canada, Guatemala, United States); and the heads of the Council of Europe, the European Council, and the European Commission.

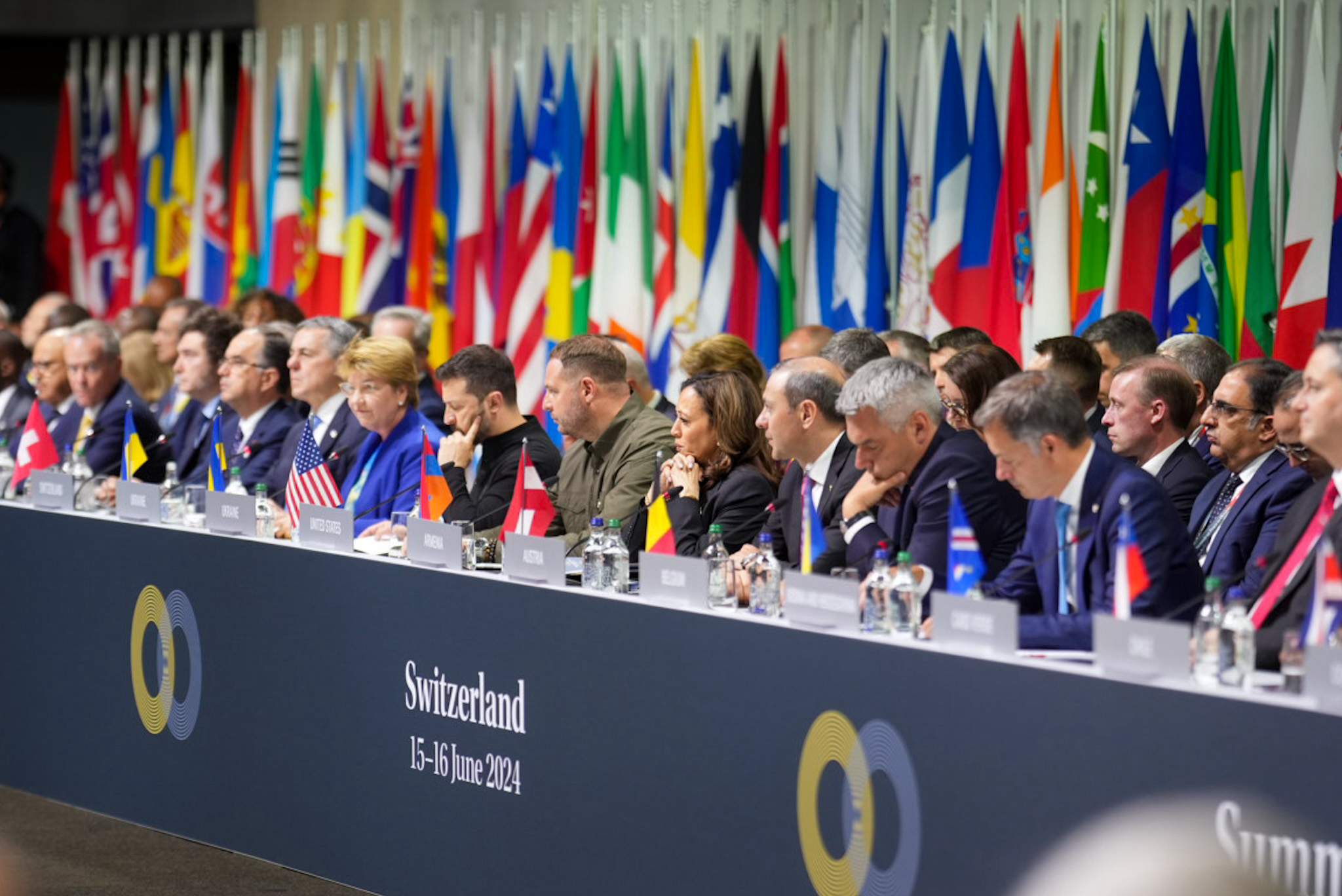
President Zelenskyy and Vice President Kamala Harris at the peace summit in Switzerland

As of 9 April 2024, China was "examining the possibility of taking part". On 26 May, Zelenskyy called for Chinese president Xi Jinping and US president Joe Biden to participate in the summit. On 3 June, planned participation by US vice-president Kamala Harris and US National Security Advisor Jake Sullivan was confirmed. Biden was expected to be absent due to an event in his re-election campaign.

Pakistan and Vietnam declined the invitation. Cambodia chose not to participate.

The full list of 100 participants, including 57 heads of state or government, was published on 14 June 2024. Altogether, representatives of 93 countries (including Switzerland) participated in the summit: Albania, Andorra, Argentina, Armenia, Australia, Austria, Bahrain, Belgium, Benin, Bosnia and Herzegovina, Brazil, Bulgaria, Canada, Cape Verde, Chile, Comoros, Costa Rica, Croatia, Cyprus, Czech Republic, Denmark, Dominican Republic, East Timor, Ecuador, Estonia, Fiji, Finland, France, Gambia, Georgia, Germany, Ghana, Greece, Guatemala, Holy See, Hungary, Iceland, India, Indonesia, Iraq, Ireland, Israel, Italy, Ivory Coast, Japan, Jordan, Kenya, Kosovo, Latvia, Liberia, Libya, Liechtenstein, Lithuania, Luxembourg, Malta, Mauritania, Mexico, Moldova, Monaco, Montenegro, Netherlands, New Zealand, North Macedonia, Norway, Palau, Peru, Philippines, Poland, Portugal, Qatar, Romania, Rwanda, San Marino, São Tomé and Príncipe, Saudi Arabia, Serbia, Singapore, Slovakia, Slovenia, Somalia, South Africa, South Korea, Spain, Suriname, Sweden, Switzerland, Thailand, Turkey, Ukraine, United Arab Emirates, United Kingdom, United States, Uruguay.

== Non-participating states ==
The FDFA stated that Russia was not invited to the June 2024 stage of the discussions; that Switzerland had "always shown openness" to inviting Russia to the first summit; and that Russia had "repeatedly and also publicly" stated that it would not participate in the first summit. The FDFA stated the Swiss point of view that Russia necessarily would have to be involved in the overall peace process, stating, "A peace process without Russia is unthinkable." Zelenskyy accused Russia of using Chinese diplomats to undermine the peace summit in Switzerland.

Citing the absence of Russia, China did not attend the weekend conference. According to sources, it has been telling developing countries that the peace summit in Switzerland would prolong the war but has not directly asked any country to abstain from the meeting. China, with Brazil, had proposed an alternative peace plan and has been trying to gather support for it. In early May 2024, Beijing's Special Envoy for Eurasian Affairs visited Brazil, Indonesia, Turkey, Egypt, Saudi Arabia, the United Arab Emirates, South Africa and Kazakhstan.

Former Thai Prime Minister Abhisit Vejjajiva said that because of the fundamental lack of trust between the United States and China, and their allies, "it’s so difficult to see how either side can claim legitimacy to initiate some kind of peace summit. The other side is simply not going to accept it."

== Themes and joint communiqué ==
The summit took place on 15–16 June 2024 as planned. The three main topics of focus for the summit were nuclear safety and security, freedom of navigation and food safety, and humanitarian aspects. The final statement of the summit, titled the "Joint Communiqué on a Peace Framework" and referring to the "ongoing war of the Russian Federation against Ukraine", was initially signed by 80 states and four international European organisations, with Jordan withdrawing on 16 June. Iraq also withdrew its signature on 16 June, as did Rwanda on 17 June, while the Ecumenical Patriarchate declared its support on 17 June and Antigua and Barbuda, the Organization of American States and Zambia signed by 19 June. On 21 June, Barbados and the Marshall Islands signed the communiqué. As of 26 September 2024, there were 89 signatures by states and six by organisations. (Note: The FDFA lists the Ecumenical Patriarchate as a supporting organisation separate from the main (counted) list of states and organisations.) Brazil, India, South Africa and Saudi Arabia, participants in the summit (with Brazil as an observer), did not sign the Communiqué.

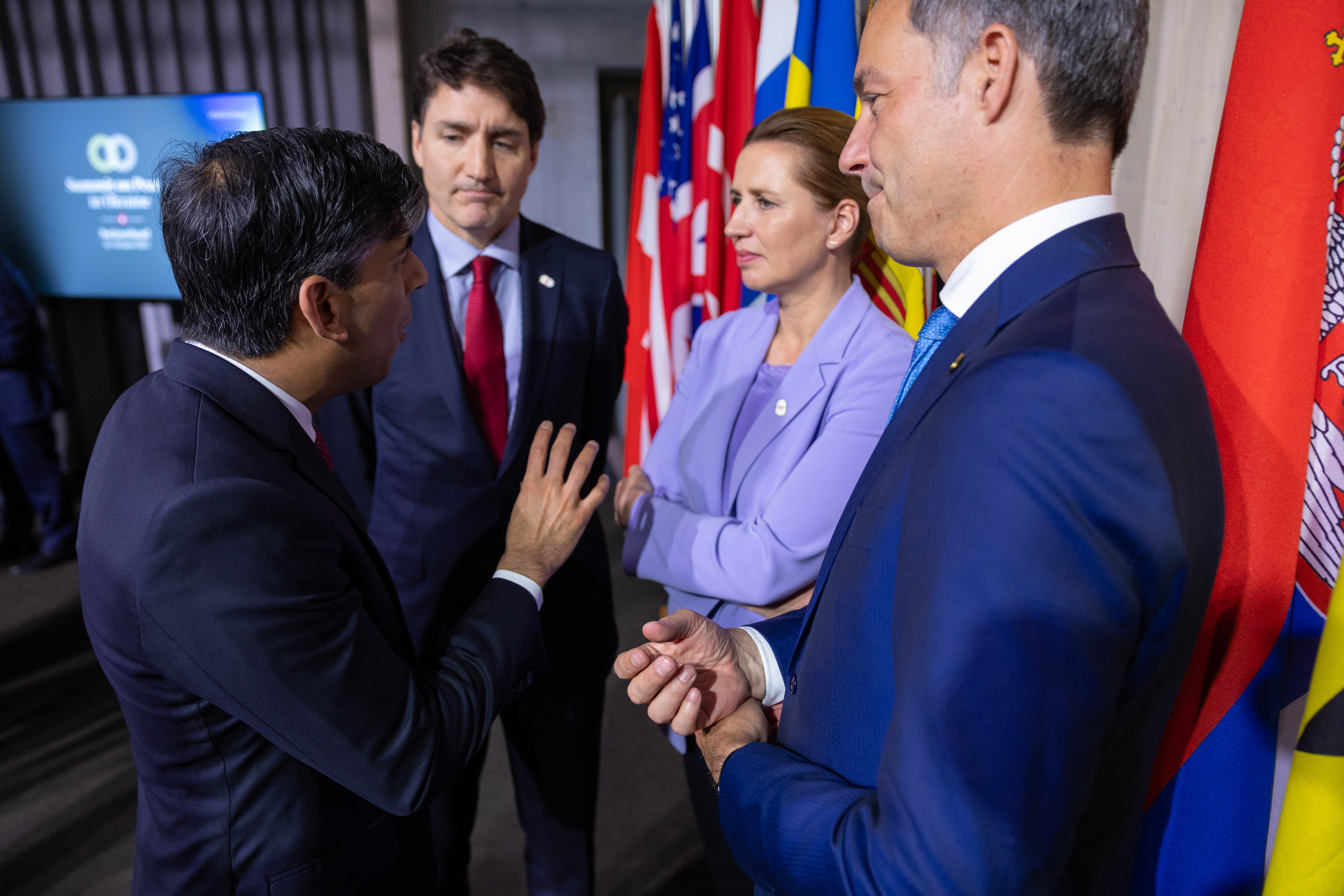
British prime minister Rishi Sunak, Canadian prime minister Justin Trudeau, Danish prime minister Mette Frederiksen and Belgian prime minister Alexander De Croo, 15 June 2024

The Joint Communiqué declared support for United Nations General Assembly resolutions A/RES/ES-11/1 and A/RES/ES-11/6 and for the Charter of the United Nations. The Communiqué "reaffirm[ed] [the signees'] commitment to refraining from the threat or use of force against the territorial integrity or political independence of any state, the principles of sovereignty, independence, and territorial integrity of all states, including Ukraine, within their internationally recognized borders, including territorial waters, and the resolution of disputes through peaceful means as principles of international law."

The Communiqué declared that the signees would "undertake concrete steps in the future in the [three themes of the summit] with further engagement of the representatives of all parties."

In his closing speech for the summit, Ghanaian president Nana Akufo-Addo stated that "in many ways, Africa [was] the greatest victim" of the Russian invasion of Ukraine. He called for Russian and Chinese participation in the peace process. Akufo-Addo stated that Ghana viewed the Russian invasion as "great power hegemony and the bullying of small states by big powers", to which Ghana is opposed. Chilean president Gabriel Boric said in his closing speech for the summit that Chile wanted "Russia and Ukraine [to] soon engage in dialogue with respect to the territorial integrity of Ukraine, international law, and a firm commitment to human rights as a fundamental standard." He stated that the summit was "not about NATO, not about right or left political ideas, not about northern or southern countries, [it was] about respect of international law and human rights, foundational principles of living together. This is applicable in Ukraine, in Gaza, and in any other conflict in the world."

=== Nuclear safety and security ===
Nuclear safety and security issues under discussion for the summit included the Zaporizhzhia Nuclear Power Plant crisis and the risk to other nuclear power stations. Improved Russian cooperation with the International Atomic Energy Agency (IAEA) constituted part of this theme.

The Joint Communiqué declared that "Ukrainian nuclear power plants and installations, including Zaporizhzhia Nuclear Power Plant, must operate safely and securely under full sovereign control of Ukraine and in line with IAEA principles and under its supervision" and that "Any threat or use of nuclear weapons in the context of the ongoing war against Ukraine is inadmissible."

=== Freedom of navigation and food safety ===
In the context of the impact of the Russian invasion of Ukraine on world food crises in terms of food production and transport and the invasion's impact on costs, actions such as the Black Sea Grain Initiative are proposed for discussion.

The Joint Communiqué declared that "Attacks on merchant ships in ports and along the entire route, as well as against civilian ports and civilian port infrastructure, are unacceptable" and that "Ukrainian agricultural products should be securely and freely provided to interested third countries."

=== Humanitarian aspects ===
Protection of civilians detained by Russian and Ukrainian authorities and the treatment of prisoners of war under international humanitarian law was discussed. "Clarif[ication] of the fate of detained and missing persons" was presented as a prerequisite for a long-term peace process.

The Joint Communiqué stated that "all prisoners of war must be released" and that all children and "other Ukrainian civilians who were unlawfully detained, must be returned to Ukraine".

== Reactions ==
Prior to the June summit itself, Zelenskyy stated in late April 2024 that Russian authorities had "a specific plan" for disrupting the summit, including plans to discourage states from participating.

Indonesian president-elect Prabowo Subianto said that "Many countries feel that in a peace summit all elements must be present, especially Russia." Indian diplomat Pavan Kapoor said that India could not sign the Joint Communiqué because "only those options acceptable to both parties can lead to abiding peace."

Cambodia announced that its officials would not attend the summit because it would be "unsuccessful" without the participation of Russia. Colombian president Gustavo Petro wrote on X that the summit's "conclusions are already predetermined" by "blocs of countries for war".

South Africa's National Security Advisor Sydney Mufamadi criticized Israel's participation at the peace summit despite Israel being accused by many UN officials of violating international law in Gaza. Saudi Foreign Minister Faisal bin Farhan Al Saud said that serious negotiations would "require difficult compromises as part of a roadmap that leads to peace. And here, it is essential to emphasise that any credible process will need Russia's participation."

Russian foreign minister Sergei Lavrov thanked Chinese foreign minister Wang Yi for China's decision not to attend the Ukraine peace summit.
