= Kathy Calvin =

- Born: July 16, 1949 (age 77); Fort Wayne, Indiana, US
- Other name: Kathy Bushkin
- Occupations: Former President, CEO, UN Foundation

Kathryn Bushkin Calvin (born July 16, 1949) was the president and chief executive officer of the United Nations Foundation from 2013 to 2019. She joined the foundation in 2003, following a diverse career in politics, journalism, public relations, and business. Kathy is one of The B Team B leaders.

== Early life ==
Calvin was born in Fort Wayne, Indiana. Later she moved to Dayton, Ohio.

== Career ==
A native of Dayton, Ohio, Calvin graduated from Purdue University in 1971 with a degree in speech therapy. She took a job with Kiplinger's Education Service in Washington, D.C., where she also became involved with a political group called the Democratic Forum, through which she met U.S. Senator Gary Hart. Hart hired her as his press secretary in 1976; she worked for him until 1984 and served as press secretary for his first presidential campaign that year.

In 1985 Mort Zuckerman subsequently hired her as director of editorial administration for U.S. News & World Report, where she worked for twelve years, during which time the magazine went from third to first among the "big three" American news magazines. She went on to lead U.S. media relations for the public relations company Hill & Knowlton.

In 1997 Calvin joined America Online as senior vice president and chief communications officer. In 2001, following the AOL–Time Warner merger, she became the president of the newly created AOL Time Warner Foundation. In that capacity, she also guided the company's other philanthropic activities and was the chief architect of the company's corporate responsibility initiatives.

She joined the UN Foundation in 2003 and was promoted to CEO in 2009. She took on the additional role of president of the UN Foundation in February 2013 following the retirement of Tim Wirth.

Calvin has long taken an active role in philanthropic activities. She and her former husband Art Bushkin founded the Stargazer Foundation in 1999 to provide technology support to nonprofit organizations. She currently serves on the board of the UN Foundation.

== Recognition ==
For her work with the UN Foundation, Calvin was recognized in 2011 by Newsweek magazine as one of "150 Women Who Shake the World."

She is also listed in Fast Company's "League of Extraordinary Woman" in 2012.

Calvin was honored with the Women and the Green Economy (WAGE) Leadership Award at the Climate Leadership Gala in 2018.

In 2019 she was named Administrator of the Year by the Romney Institute of Public Management at the BYU Marriott School of Business.

== Personal ==
A resident of the Washington, DC area, Calvin has two adopted children and remarried in 2006 to John Calvin.
