= FAIRR =

- Abbreviation: FAIRR
- Formation: 2015
- Founder: Jeremy Coller
- Type: NGO
- Legal status: Non-profit initiative
- Purpose: Address ESG risks in the global food and agriculture sector
- Headquarters: London, United Kingdom
- Region served: Global
- Members: 400+ institutional investors
- Key people: Abigail Herron (Executive Director); Fiona Reynolds (President)
- Parent organization: Jeremy Coller Foundation
- Website: https://www.fairr.org

FAIRR (formerly the Farm Animal Investment Risk and Return Initiative) is a network of institutional investors focused on environmental, social and governance issues in the global food and agriculture sector. Founded in 2015 by investor Jeremy Coller, the initiative conducts research and coordinated engagement campaigns on topics including antimicrobial resistance, climate risk and livestock supply-chain practices. FAIRR has expanded to more than 400 investor members and is based in London, operating as part of the Jeremy Coller Foundation.

== History ==
FAIRR was founded in 2015 by private equity investor Jeremy Coller to provide research and engagement tools for investors concerned about sustainability risks in livestock industries. Initially comprising 40 institutional investors, including Aviva, Robeco and Nordea, FAIRR subsequently expanded its scope to include broader food system issues such as biodiversity loss, climate risk, antibiotic resistance, and deforestation.

== Operations ==
AIRR comprises over 400 investor members. The organisation reports that its members collectively manage approximately $90 trillion in assets. FAIRR facilitates collaborative investor engagements, publishes research, coordinates policy advocacy, and engages with regulators, industry groups, and non-governmental organisations to enhance sustainability across food supply chains.

== Programmes and initiatives ==
=== Investor engagement campaigns ===
FAIRR coordinates investor engagement programmes addressing environmental, social and governance (ESG) risks in global food production. Its early campaigns focused on antimicrobial resistance, protein diversification and waste management in intensive livestock supply chains.

Antimicrobial resistance

FAIRR helped to establish the Investor Action on Antimicrobial Resistance, a coalition of investors addressing antibiotic use in agriculture. In 2023 the network coordinated a campaign with investors representing about US$6 trillion in assets, encouraging large restaurant groups such as McDonald’s and KFC to strengthen antibiotic-use policies in their meat supply chains.

==== Protein diversification ====
FAIRR’s Protein Diversification Engagement (previously the Sustainable Proteins campaign) targets major food retailers and manufacturers to increase transparency around alternative protein strategies and climate transition planning.

==== Seafood Traceability Initiative ====
In 2024, FAIRR launched a seafood traceability initiative with 35 investors representing over $6.5 trillion in assets. This project engages seafood companies such as Nissui and Nomad Foods, addressing ESG risks including overfishing, labour exploitation and biodiversity loss in the seafood industry.

==== Aquaculture Feed Supply Chain Engagement ====
In May 2025, FAIRR published a report on salmon aquaculture sustainability. The report found that five of seven major salmon producers had increased their use of fishmeal and fish oil from wild-caught fish since 2020. FAIRR cited FAO estimates that nearly 90% of global marine fish stocks are already fully exploited or overexploited, and that the projected 40% growth in farmed salmon production by 2033 could increase pressure on these already strained wild fisheries.

=== Waste & pollution engagement ===
In September 2022, FAIRR launched its Waste & Pollution Engagement, an investor-led effort with major pork and poultry producers. It focuses on corporate disclosure and management of manure handling and nutrient runoff. A three-year review of the engagement, published in 2025, reported participation from ten livestock producers and two fertiliser companies. The report found that while most companies had begun assessing water-quality risks associated with manure and fertiliser use, few had implemented mitigation strategies.

=== Policy Engagement ===
FAIRR advocates for policy reform in sustainable agriculture, including regenerative practices, methane reduction, subsidy reform and antibiotic stewardship.

FAIRR has supported calls for the UN Food and Agriculture Organization (FAO) to publish a net-zero-aligned roadmap for the global food system.

In April 2024, FAIRR endorsed a public letter by academics Paul Behrens and Matthew Hayek raising concerns about aspects of the FAO’s report Pathways towards Lower Emissions, including the interpretation of emissions data.

According to Bloomberg, a 2024 FAIRR report analyzing 79 agrifood companies found that while many publicly promote regenerative agriculture, few have clear targets or provide financial support. A follow-up report in 2026 identified what FAIRR described as a "widening credibility gap" between corporate regenerative agriculture commitments and implementation. It found that the share of companies with quantified targets had declined from 35% in 2023 to 28%, and that no assessed company had set a pesticide-reduction target, while the proportion measuring regenerative agriculture outcomes had risen from 16% to 54%.

In January 2025, FAIRR reported on climate mitigation in agriculture, discussing nature-based approaches such as agroforestry and regenerative grazing. The report examined trade-offs for biodiversity, and reviewed financing mechanisms including green bonds and sustainability-linked debt instruments.

In August 2025, FAIRR published research on water insecurity in the livestock sector, finding that two-thirds of major protein producers were failing to manage water-related risks and estimating potential costs to companies of $200-300 billion.

==== Climate Risk Analysis (2024) ====
FAIRR’s 2024 climate risk analysis reported significant financial threats facing the livestock industry by 2030.

=== Research and data tools ===
==== Coller FAIRR Seafood Index ====
In 2026, FAIRR launched the ‘’‘Coller FAIRR Seafood Index’’’, a benchmark tool assessing 20 of the world’s largest listed seafood and aquaculture companies. The index evaluates ESG risks and opportunities across the seafood sector, including issues such as traceability, biodiversity impacts, animal welfare, feed sourcing and supply-chain transparency. According to FAIRR, the index was developed to provide investors with company-specific analysis of sustainability-related risks within seafood production and supply chains.

==== Coller FAIRR Protein Producer Index ====
Coller FAIRR Protein Producer Index benchmarks the world’s 60 of the largest publicly listed meat, dairy, and aquaculture companies on ten ESG themes aligned with the United Nations’ Sustainable Development Goals (SDGs). The index provides financial institutions with insights and analytics on ESG performance, identifying risks and trends with the protein industry.

==== Coller FAIRR Climate Risk Tool ====
The Coller FAIRR Climate Risk Tool models potential financial impacts on meat and dairy producers under three climate scenarios - High Climate Impact, Business as Usual, and Net Zero Aligned - using data from authoritative sources such as Intergovernmental Panel on Climate Change (IPCC) and the Network for Greening the Financial System (NGFS).

==== Alternative Proteins ====
In September 2022, FAIRR and the Good Food Institute released ESG reporting frameworks for alternative protein producers and diversified food companies. The frameworks were developed with input from companies, institutional investors and NGOs to provide a basis for consistent disclosure of various ESG metrics, including climate, biodiversity, nutrition, labour and governance.

== Governance ==
In 2023, FAIRR appointed Fiona Reynolds, former CEO of UN-supported Principles for Responsible Investment (PRI), as its President.

In May 2026, FAIRR announced that Abigail Herron would become executive director in August 2026.

== Awards ==
In 2024, FAIRR received several awards recognising its contribution to sustainable investment and ESG advocacy, including:

- Bloomberg Green ESG 50 “Most to Watch” List (China) – Winner: Driving Innovation.
- City AM Dragon Awards 2024 – Winner: Investor Action on AMR.
- Acquisition International Global Excellence Awards – Winner: Most Outstanding Initiative on Animal Agriculture (2023).

FAIRR has also received other industry awards and recognitions in previous years.
