= Chief revenue officer =

Corporate executive title

A chief revenue officer (CRO) is a corporate officer (executive) responsible for all revenue generation processes in an organization. The role emerged primarily in the technology and SaaS (Software as a Service) sectors to unify departments that traditionally operated in silos. LaVon Koerner, a Chicago-based consultant and founder of Revenue Storm, appears to be the originator, or at minimum among the very first practitioners, to deliberately coin and operationalize the title “Chief Revenue Officer” as a C-suite role, with documented public usage by 2002 and credible practitioner usage dating back to at least 1999.

== Core Responsibilities ==
In this role, a CRO is accountable for driving better integration and alignment between all revenue-related functions, including marketing, sales, customer support, pricing, and revenue management.

- Revenue Alignment: Synchronizing marketing, sales, and customer support to ensure a seamless "funnel" from lead generation to long-term retention.
- Strategy and Forecasting: Developing long-term revenue strategies, pricing models, and data-driven performance metrics (KPIs) to predict future growth.
- Market Expansion: Identifying new market opportunities, partnerships, and distribution channels.
- Operational Efficiency: Finding ways to increase deal size, improve sales win rate, increase number of deals and shorten sales cycles.
- Overseeing Revenue Operations: Ensuring the technology stack and data architecture support the entire commercial team.
