= Distrigas (disambiguation) =

Distrigas may refer to:

- Distrigas, a defunct Belgium natural gas company
- Distrigas of Massachusetts, a Liquified Natural Gas (LNG) operator in North America, owned by GDF Suez
- GDF Suez Romania (former Distrigaz Sud), a Romanian natural gas company
- E.ON Gaz Romania (former Distrigaz Nord), a Romanian natural gas company
