= Ruhrgas =

German natural gas company

Ruhrgas AG
- Industry: Oil and gas
- Founded: 1926; 99 years ago in Essen, Germany
- Founder: Vereinigte Stahlwerke AG; Zeche Mathias Stinnes
- Defunct: 2013
- Successor: E.ON Global Commodities SE; Open Grid Europe
- Products: Coal gas Natural gas
- Parent: E.ON

Ruhrgas AG (original name: Aktiengesellschaft für Kohleverwertung; later: E.ON Ruhrgas) was the largest natural gas transportation and trading company based in Essen, Germany. The company was founded in 1926 and it finally ceased to exist on 2 May 2013 when it was merged into E.ON Global Commodities SE (now: Uniper Global Commodities SE).

== History ==
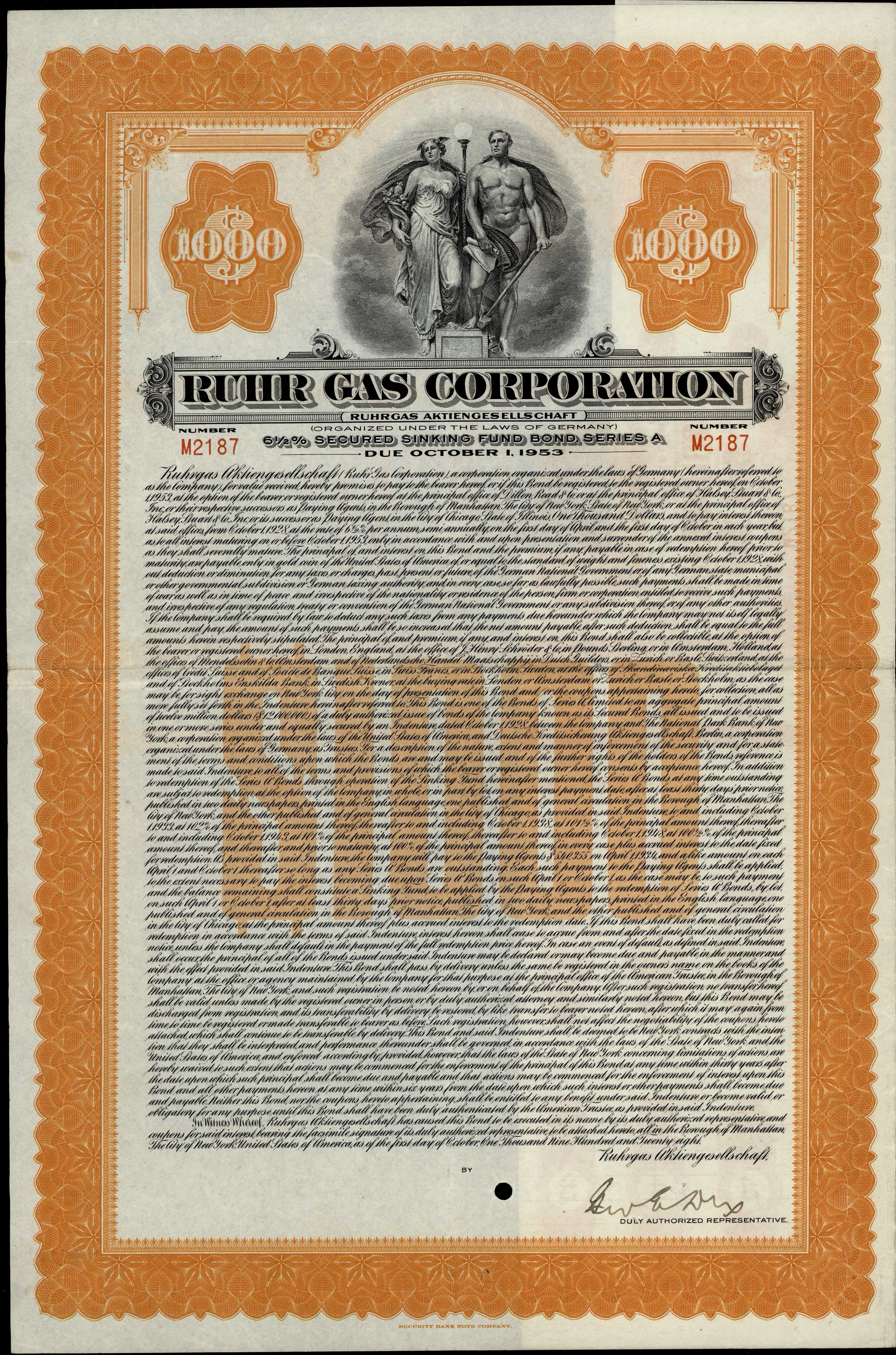
American bond of Ruhrgas AG, issued 1. October 1928

=== 1929-1940 ===
Ruhrgas AG was founded in 1926 as a natural gas transportation company by Vereinigte Stahlwerke AG and Zeche Mathias Stinnes as Aktiengesellschaft für Kohleverwertung. The newly founded company took over the distribution of coal gas produced in the coking plants Vereinigte Stahlwerke AG and Zeche Mathias Stinne in the economical important coalmining region Ruhrdistrict. In 1928, Aktiengesellschaft für Kohleverwertung acquired the 300-kilometre-long (190 mi) pipeline network from RWE AG. Consequently, the company was renamed Ruhrgas AG. By the end of the decade, gas supply contracts were signed with the cities of Cologne, Düsseldorf, Hanover, and Saarbrücken. By 1930, total sales of coal gas by Ruhrgas amounted to 0.3 billion cubic metres (11 billion cubic feet), and its pipeline network covered 857 kilometres (533 mi). By 1936, its pipeline network accounted 1,128 kilometres (701 mi) and the company delivered 2 billion cubic metres (71 billion cubic feet) of coal gas from 32 coking plants. Among other industries, it delivered gas to Adam Opel works.

In 1938, natural gas was found near Bad Bentheim. In 1939, at the request of the Reich Ministry of Economics requested Ruhrgas to integrate the gas deposit into the existing pipeline network. However, due to the World War II, it was not until 1944 that a 75-kilometre-long (47 mi) pipeline from Bad Bentheim to the chemical works in Hüls was completed. During the World War II a lot of the gas infrastructure was destroyed. However, by the end of 1945, the pipeline network was 90% restored.

In the 1940s, Ruhrgas in cooperation with Lurgi Gesellschaft für Wärmetechnik G.m.b.H. developed the Lurgi–Ruhrgas process, a process for a low-temperature liquefaction of lignite (brown coal) and oil shale.

In 1948, Ruhrgas together with Thyssengas started coal gas export to the Netherlands. By 1965, the Ruhrgas pipeline network was expanded up to 3,402 kilometres (2,114 mi) and the total sales of gas was 3.3 billion cubic metres (120 billion cubic feet), of which 10% was natural gas.

=== Deals with Soviet Union and Norway ===
In 1970, Ruhrgas signed the first contract to buy and import natural gas from the Soviet Union, a volume of 52,5 billion cubic metres worth 762 million dollar. The Soviet Union did ask the delivery of steel pipelinematerial from works located in Western-Germany in return. The steelworks of Mannesmann and Thyssen did produce 1.3 million tonnes of steel, the largest order ever. In a second contract between the Russian Bank of International Trade and four German commercial banks, a loan of 1.2 - 1.5 billion Deutsche Mark was given to the Soviet Union. Ruhrgas now became the largest natural gas import and distribution company in Germany. In 1971, Ruhrgas started supplying natural gas to Switzerland through the Trans Europa Naturgas Pipeline in cooperation with Snam and Swissgas.

In 1973, it signed a contract to buy natural gas from the North Sea Ekofisk field through the Norpipe pipeline. Deliveries from Norway started in 1977. In 1973, Ruhrgas started to buy Soviet gas through East Germany to supply West Berlin. In 1975, Ruhrgas and Gaz de France formed a partnership Mittel-Europäische-Gasleitungsgesellschaft to build the MEGAL pipeline for transportation of Russian natural gas to France and southern Germany. The pipeline was commissioned in 1980. In 1982, it signed a contract with Soyuzgasexport supporting construction of the Urengoy–Pomary–Uzhhorod pipeline. At the same year, Ruhrgas joined the consortium to import natural gas from Statfjord field. Deliveries started after commissioning the Statpipe pipeline in 1985.

In 1998, Ruhrgas owned a pipeline network of 10,361 kilometres (6,438 mi) with 26 compressor stations and 12 underground storage facilities. It sold 50.9 billion cubic metres (1.80 trillion cubic feet) of natural gas.

In 1999, the company donated US$3.5 million for restoration of the Amber Room, located in the Catherine Palace of Tsarskoye Selo near Saint Petersburg.

=== E.ON ===
Ruhrgas was acquired by energy company E.ON in March 2003. On 1 July 2004, the company was renamed accordingly E.ON Ruhrgas. That time, it became the largest foreign shareholder in the Russian gas company Gazprom by 6.5% of shares. These shares were bought back by Gazprom in October 2009 as a result of the asset-swap deal between E.On and Gazprom. As a result of the deal, E.ON Ruhrgas acquired a 25% stake, minus three ordinary registered shares plus three preference non-voting shares in Severneftegazprom, an operator of the Yuzhno-Russkoye field.

In June 2005, E.ON Ruhrgas acquired 51% of the Romanian gas utility DistriGaz Nord and renamed it E.ON Gaz România. On 8 September 2005, E.ON Ruhrgas signed an agreement to participate in the Nord Stream 1 project. The pipeline became operational in 2011.

By 2008, E.ON Ruhrgas owned 11,552 kilometres (7,178 mi) of pipelines.

In July 2010, E.ON Ruhrgas acquired 15% of the shares in the Trans Adriatic Pipeline project.

On 1 September 2010, based on the European Union Third Energy Package, the gas transportation and gas storage operations of E.ON Ruhrgas were transferred to E.ON Gastransport and renamed Open Grid Europe. On 2 May 2013, E.ON Ruhrgas was merged with E.ON Global Commodities SE, now part of Uniper.

The name Ruhrgas is still used by Uniper Ruhrgas International GmbH, a subsidiary of Uniper. It was founded as E.ON Ruhrgas International GmbH in 1994, after takeover of Ruhrgas by E.ON on the basis of Ruhrgas international activities.

== Shareholders ==
Before acquisition by E.ON, shareholders of Ruhrgas were:

- Bergemann GmbH (59.76%) – a holding company owned by Gelsenberg AG (Deutsche BP Holding AG), RAG BeteiligungsGmbH (RAG AG), Mannesmann AG, ThyssenKrupp AG, RWE DEA AG, VEBA AG;
- 25% Brigitta Erdgas und Erdöl GmbH – a joint venture owned by Esso AG and Deutsche Shell AG;
- 15% Schubert KG u. a. – a holding company owned by Schubert Beteiligungs GmbH (a joint venture of Mobil Oil AG and Preussag AG), Elwerath Erdgas und Erdöl GmbH (a joint venture of ESSO AG and Deutsche Shell AG), Gelsenberg AG (Deutsche BP Holding AG);
- 0.24% minority shareholders.

== Bibliography ==
- Bros, Aurélie; Mitrova, Tatiana; Westphal, Kirsten (December 2017). German-Russian Gas Relations. A Special Relationship in Troubled Waters (PDF). SWP Research Paper. SWP.
