= Carbon Connect Delta Program =

Proposed carbon sequestration program

The Carbon Connect Delta Program is a proposed carbon sequestration program to aid Belgium and the Netherlands in achieving carbon neutrality by 2030. It aims to capture, transport, and store 6.5 million tones of CO_{2} by 2030 using carbon capture and storage (CCS) in the transboundary area of the North Sea Port area of the Scheldt-Delta region connecting Belgium and the Netherlands.

The project is set up by a consortium of Belgian and Dutch companies and will begin with a feasibility study. This consortium is transboundary conglomerate consisting of participating and funding companies Smart Delta Resources, port company North Sea Port, the companies ArcelorMittal, Dow Benelux, PZEM, Yara and Zeeland Refinery, and infrastructure partners Gasunie and Fluxys. The project is additionally funded by the Dutch Government under the Sustainable Energy Transition Subsidy Scheme (SDE+) which currently has a budget of 13 billion euros for all sustainable energy projects across the Netherlands.

== Carbon offsetting-potential ==
The project aims to achieve climate neutrality for the Scheldt-Delta region by 2050. The Carbon Connect Delta Programs will do so by capturing 1 million tones of CO_{2} per year by the end of 2023 and a further 6.5 million tones per year by 2030. Although ambitious this would achieve reductions in atmospheric CO_{2} for the Scheldt-Delta region from regional carbon producing activities by 30% and aid in achieving 40% of the Dutch CO_{2} reduction targets. The use of CCS in the region constitutes the most cost-effective and timely alternatives to carbon sequestration using sustainable technologies as forecasted by the Belgian and Dutch consortium for the next ten years.

== The Scheldt-Delta region ==
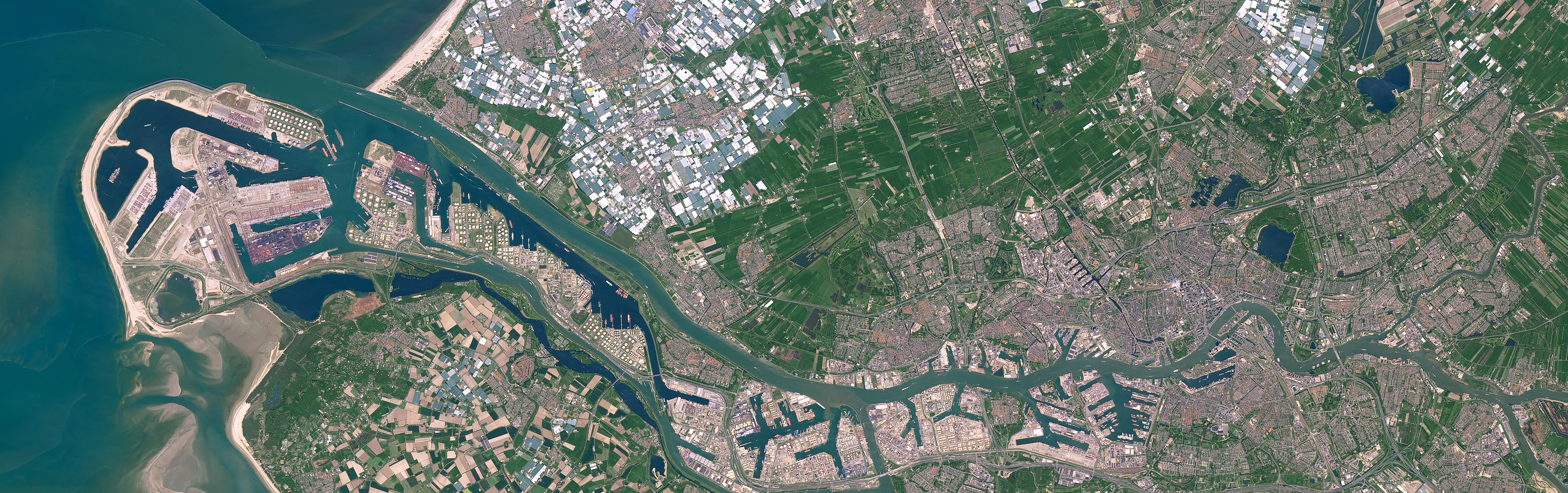
North Sea Port

The SDR (Scheldt-Delta region) represents one of five major industrial and commercial hubs in the Netherlands, as an industrial cluster it represents 21% of Dutch commercial CO_{2} emissions. The area is of high economic importance as the North Sea Port in SDR region participates 12.5 billion euros to the economy and provides 100’000 jobs. The SDR region aims to achieve carbon neutrality using CO_{2} reduction pathways under the existing Green House Gas Protocol where CCUS and the transition to hydrogen are of the utmost importance. The Scheldt Delta has its origins in St. Quentin, France, and is a portion of the rain-fed 355 km long river Scheldt which connects to the portion of the Atlantic Ocean called the North Sea.

== Responsible parties ==
The Carbon Connect Delta Program groups the largest green energy and climate-neutral industries across the Netherlands/Flanders region of Europe. The SDR organizations will be contributing to the success of the Carbon Connect Delta Program include Air Liquide, Air Products, ArcelorMittal, Cargill, Cosun, Dow, Engie, Fluxys, Gasunie, Lamb Weston/Meijer, Ørsted, PZEM, Trinseo, Vopak, Yara, Zeeland Refinery, Impuls Zeeland, North Sea Port, province of Zeeland, province of East Flanders and Ghent University. It is Gasunie and Fluxys, who will be responsible for the infrastructure of the project. Regulations and policies under which the project is subject to are regulated by the Ministry of Economic Affairs and Climate for CCS development.

=== Fluxys ===
Fluxys

Fluxys is an existing European natural gas pipeline company that will be responsible for the transportation aspect of the project. Fluxys is an independent energy infrastructure company from Belgium that is aiming towards a sustainable green energy future. Shareholders include Publigas from Belgium, Energy Infrastructure Partners (EIP) energy sector specialists from Switzerland, The Federal Holding and Investment Company from Belgium, AG Insurance, Ethias insurance group from Belgium, and Fluxys employees who are shareholders themselves. Fluxys currently supplies pipeline and ship transportation for CO_{2}, LNG, natural gas, and more on the European transmission grid connecting France, Germany, Spain, Switzerland, the United Kingdom, the Netherlands, and Italy. In an effort to achieve climate neutrality, Fluxys is supplying infrastructure for transporting methane, hydrogen, and carbon.

=== Gasunie ===
Gasunie

Gasunie is a Dutch natural gas company that will equally be responsible for the capture and transportation aspects of the project. Gasunie owns and operates transportation and storage terminals for natural gas liquefied natural gas (LNG) and CO_{2} across the Dutch gas network and into northern Europe. Gasunie owns 60% of the BBL natural gas transborder pipeline connecting the United Kingdom and the Netherlands, and 42.5% of the Gate terminal, the first LNG terminal in the Netherlands. Providing transborder energy infrastructure and storage for hydrogen, natural gas, and capture/reuse of CO_{2}, ensuring sustainability and working towards climate neutrality. Gasunie aims to use the sequestered CO_{2} in greenhouses to produce fruits and vegetables in an effort to achieve regional sustainability.

=== Smart Delta Resources ===
Smart Delta Resources aims to contribute to carbon neutrality by 2050 by switching to hydrogen-based solutions for industrial processes, using CCS', and reusing residual heat in a circular energy-based program. SDR consists of a transboundary consortium between major industries including chemical, steel, energy, and food manufacturers in the Scheldt-Delta region aiming to offset the region carbon-producing activities. In line with the reduction of greenhouse gas emissions from the Scheldt-Delta region commercial industry SDR aims to use the capturing, storing, and reusing of CO_{2} (also known as CCUS) to work towards climate neutrality for the Netherlands by 2050.

== Technology and infrastructure components ==
The project will feature a combination of CO_{2} sequestration, transportation, and storage infrastructure connecting the Port of Rotterdam, Port of Rotterdam, Port of Antwerp, and the North Sea Port Area. The storage and reuse of CO_{2} as is the case in this project is referred to scientifically as the Carbon Capture, Use, and Storage or CCUS. CO_{2} storage facilities include the Rotterdam Nucleus which will house the Porthos project valued at 6.5 million euros and the Antwerp pipeline and storage facility operated by CO_{2} TransPorts valued at 5.8 million euros. The hope is to store the CO_{2} transported by pipeline and by ship to the empty gas fields at Porthos in Rotterdam, at Athos in the North Sea Canal region, or other facilities yet to be established for which Gasunie is currently responsible. Onshore transportation involves pipelines across the Western Scheldt region of the Netherlands (Zuid-Beverland) to the Bergen-op-Zoom region of the Southwestern Netherlands. There are additionally, two offshore transportation options using the ports and shipping routes between the SDR North Sea Port and the Rotterdam port area.

Regardless of onshore or offshore transportation methods, shipments of CO_{2} have requirements, including connections to terminal facilities for purification, liquefaction, storage, and marine handling. An extensive risk assessment and market survey has been completed by the DNV-GL group in regard to risk probability, risk impact, and ship transportation determinations for the shipment and terminal storage of CO_{2} from the SDR region. Within the Carbon Connect Delta Program, Fluxys infrastructure responsibilities include ensuring the infrastructure respect regulations for CO_{2} transportation, protecting and upkeep of the infrastructure from erosion from natural elements exposure, and ensuring interchangeability with adjacent systems including methane and hydrogen. Gasunie's infrastructure responsibilities include sequestration of CO_{2}, transportation by pipeline and ship, and storage using CCUS to achieve climate neutrality for the SDR region by 2050. Smart Delta Resources, the responsible party for overseeing the entirety of the Carbon Connect Delta project aims to connect the project to intensive collaborations with sustainable hydrogen, electricity, and heat solution projects.

== International scale ==
As the Carbon Connect Delta project aims to set the standards for regulations regarding the cross-border integrated infrastructure capture and transportation of CO_{2} for the European Union, regarding carbon capture and storage. The project will contribute to CCS occurring internationally in an effort to achieve carbon neutrality, which currently captures over 40 million tons of CO_{2} and climbing per year as of 2022. The Carbon Connect Delta project will contribute to international CCS including but not limited to:

=== China ===
In an effort to achieve climate neutrality, the Xinjiang province is aiming to capture a minimum of 10 million tons of CO_{2} per year by 2060 using their proposed CCUS hub project. The project is spearheaded by China Petroleum Corporation (CNPC) and the Oil and Gas Climate Initiative (OGCI) and aims to offset the carbon production of local industry including cement production, steel production, and power plants which mostly use coal in the region.

=== Iceland ===
The Orca Carbon Capture plant owned and operated by Climeworks has been sequestering atmospheric CO_{2} since 2021, in cohesion with a geothermal powerplant. The CO_{2} is sequestered using giant filters and it is heated using the energy generated from the corresponding geothermal powerplant, which in turn is recycled to create carbonated water. For further storage, the created carbonated water is pumped underground where is it stored as the final step of CCUS by interacting the basaltic bedrock.

=== Japan ===
Japanese shipping companies are actively liquefying CO_{2} in CCS transportation and aim to transport CO_{2} from major industries to the Tomokomai CCUS project by 2024. Japan is pioneering the transboundary CCUS collaboration within the Asia-Pacific region, aiming for net-zero carbon neutrality by 2050. In addition, Japan much like the Carbon Connect Delta program aims to connect its carbon CCUS with hydrogen CCUS in an effort to further achieve carbon neutrality.

=== Switzerland ===
Known as the original CCUS, the direct carbon sequestration capture plant has been sequestering atmospheric CO_{2} since 2008, it is owned and operated by Climeworks. Similarly to Iceland, the plant uses high heat to transport the sequestered CO_{2} into greenhouses around the country where is it used as fertilizer in an effort to achieve climate neutrality.

== Environmental and economic benefits ==
The Carbon Connect Delta program represents an essential first step towards a CO_{2}-neutral and circular industry using carbon capture and storage for the Scheldt Delta region. The application of CCS (carbon capture and connect) is crucial in the region's ambitious transition to a hydrogen economy. As the Intergovernmental Panel on Climate Change (IPCC) climate policy publications continue to demonstrate the need for countries around the world to invest in CCUS, the Carbon Connect Delta program is aiming to fulfill this need and achieve climate neutrality for Belgium and the Netherlands under the United Nations Sustainable Development Goals (SDG). The project further aims to set the standards for regulations regarding the cross-border integrated infrastructure capture and transportation of CO_{2} for the European Union. To accomplish this the consortium of Dutch and Belgian companies directing the project will ensure subsidies are provided for costs pertaining to shipping and pipeline transportation, while ensuring regional public-private collaboration in line with societal needs. The consortium is doing so to ensure a level playing field for those involved in the Carbon Connect Delta program regardless of economic standing and resource availability. On a larger scale, the development of regulations in line with the 2009 amendment of the London Protocol ensures that transportation of CO_{2} within the project is eligible for emission rights as detailed in the EU ETS framework while aiding in sequestering CO_{2} across national boundaries. In addition to the added economic value to the area, the project is set to create several thousand jobs further increasing the area's GDP while aiming to achieve carbon neutrality.

== Regulations ==
The Carbon Connect Delta project falls under the policies and regulations outlined by the Ministry of Economic Affairs and Climate for CCS development, under the guise of the Government of the Netherlands to create a sustainable business sector. The project additionally aims to fulfill the regulations outlined under the 2009 amendment of the London Protocol, through which CCUS of CO_{2}-based projects are eligible for the UN ETS (Emissions Trading System) framework if they are participating in transboundary CO_{2} sequestration. Although, not yet in effect the Carbon Connect Delta aims to set the standards for regulations regarding the transborder carbon capture, use, and capture (CCUS) for the European Union. The EU does not currently have legislation in place regarding CCUS, regulations fall within the responsibilities of individual countries' existing regulatory framework for industrial activities and their emissions.

== Public engagement ==
Smart Delta Resources officials in conjunction with the Governments of Belgium and the Netherlands, have completed societal readiness and public engagement evaluations for the Carbon Connect Delta project. These public engagements include research with local academic communities, engaging local communities, schools and universities, civil societies, policymakers, and members of the transboundary public. Public consultations included business model participation, site visits, workshops in local schools, group model building, and consultations with public members. CCUS projects remain political strategies by governments aiming to achieve social acceptance of emission-related projects.

== Current status ==
Still in the planning stage due to global setbacks from the 2020 pandemic, the project is currently undergoing feasibility studies throughout the North Sea Port area, and CO_{2} transportation options are currently being accessed. The feasibility studies include evaluating the economical, social, and legal implications and policy frameworks to map out the entire project from the large-scale capture, transportation, and storage of CO_{2} using carbon capture and storage. The decision has yet to be made as to if the transportation of CO_{2} will occur by ship or pipeline to the storage facilities in developing Porthos and Aramis projects within Rotterdam in the Netherlands. Currently, 21 potential ship and pipeline transportation scenarios for use in the Carbon Connect Delta program have been mapped out.

The current status is focused on the development of the Porthos CO_{2} storage facilities and establishing port linkage between the ports of Rotterdam, Antwerp, and the North Sea Port as the area does not currently have the infrastructure (target 2024). Additionally, under the feasibility study environmental impacts and risk assessments are completed in the evaluation. Under the study, synergy opportunities and the mapping of various combinations of the project components, thus capture, transport, and storage of the CO_{2} which benefit the economy, project timeline, flexibility in project processing, project risk, and environmental feasibility. The aim is to have a well-established CO_{2} pipeline network between Antwerp and the North Sea Port area by 2026 to begin the mass-scale carbon sequestration, transportation, and storage in the established Porthos and Aramis storage projects. Once established the carbon sequestration initiative will travel further south to Ludwigshafen to aid Belgium and the Netherlands in their quest to achieve carbon neutrality by 2050.
