= MEGAL pipeline =

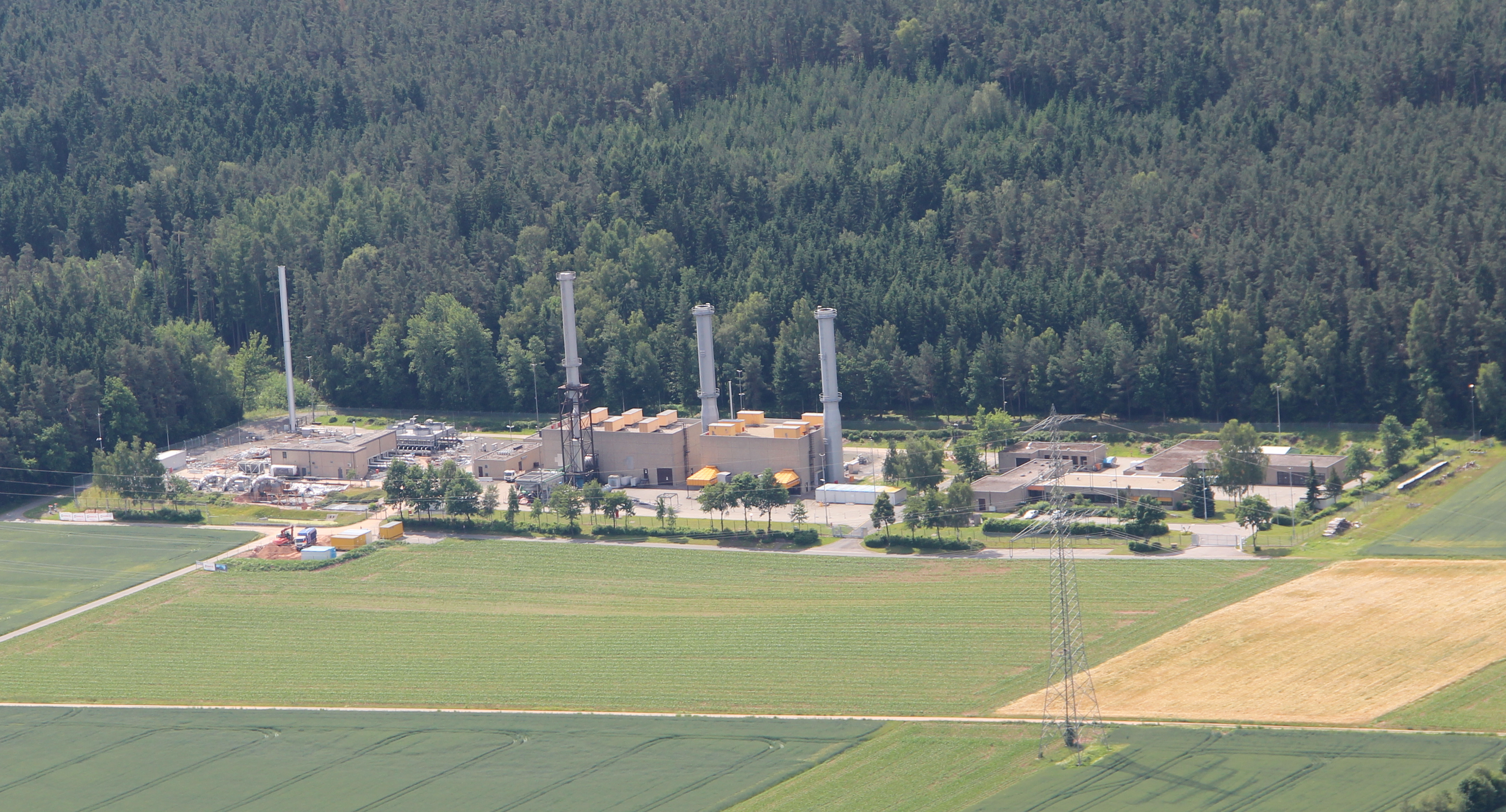
- Natural gas compressor station at Rothenstadt
- Location of MEGAL pipeline

Location
- Country: Germany
- Direction: east-west
- Start: Waidhaus, Oberkappel
- Passes through: Schwandorf, Rothenstadt, Weiherhammer, Rimpar, Gernsheim, Mittelbrunn
- To: Medelsheim

General information
- Type: natural gas
- Partners: Open Grid Europe; GRTgaz; OMV
- Operator: GRTgaz Deutschland GmbH
- Commissioned: 1980; 46 years ago

Technical information
- Length: 1,115 km (693 mi)
- Maximum discharge: 22 billion cubic metres per year

The MEGAL pipeline (German: Mittel-Europäische-Gasleitung) is a major natural gas pipeline system in southern Germany. It transports natural gas from the Czech–German and Austrian–German borders to the German–French border.

== History ==
Construction started in 1975 when Ruhrgas and Gaz de France formed a partnership (Mittel-Europäische-Gasleitungsgesellschaft) for transportation of Russian natural gas to France and southern Germany. The pipeline was commissioned in 1980. The pipeline cost €634 million.

In July 2009, the European Commission fined GDF Suez, now Engie and E.ON €553 million each due to collusion on the MEGAL pipeline. Commission officials claimed there was a deal between the two groups’ predecessor companies – Gaz de France and Ruhrgas – not to sell gas sent via MEGAL into each other's home markets dating from the mid-1970s. The Commission alleged that the companies maintained these arrangements after European gas markets were liberalised despite knowing that the 1975 deal violated competition rules. They are the second largest fines imposed by the European Commission and the first on the energy sector. The decision is contested by both companies, who argue that the business rules in 1975 differed from those of today. In 1975, Ruhrgas and Gaz de France concluded arrangements according to which they agreed not to sell gas in each other's home market. The deal was abandoned in 2005.

== Technical description ==
The pipeline system is 1,115 kilometres (693 mi) long. It comprises two interconnected pipelines—MEGAL Nord and MEGAL Süd. The MEGAL Nord pipeline consists of two parallel pipelines with a length of 459 kilometres (285 mi) and 449 kilometres (279 mi) from Waidhaus to Medelsheim. It is operated at a pressure of 80 bar (1,160 psi), which is secured by three compressor stations. The capacity of the pipeline is 22 billion cubic metres (777 billion cubic feet) of natural gas per year, or a little more than 60 million cubic metres (2 billion cubic feet) per day.

The 167-kilometre (104 mi)-long MEGAL Süd pipeline between Oberkappel and Schwandorf is operated at a pressure of 67.5 bar (979 psi), which is secured by two compressor stations. The connecting pipeline between MEGAL Nord and MEGAL Süd is 40 kilometres (25 mi) long and it is connected in Rothenstadt and Schwandorf.

The MEGAL pipeline crosses the Trans Europa Naturgas Pipeline and the Remich pipeline at Mittelbrunn, the METG (pipeline from the German-Dutch border) at Gernsheim, and the pipeline going to the Ruhr Industrial Area at Rimpar.

== Ownership ==
The pipeline is owned by Open Grid Europe (51%) and GRTgaz Deutschland (subsidiary of GRTgaz – 49%). It is operated by Open Grid Europe.
