= Transitgas Pipeline =

Natural gas pipeline in Switzerland

Transitgas

Location
- Country: Switzerland
- Direction: north-south
- Start: Wallbach, Rodersdorf
- Passes through: Lostorf, Däniken, Ruswil
- To: Gries Pass

General information
- Type: natural gas
- Partners: Fluxys; Swissgas
- Operator: FluxSwiss
- Commissioned: 1974

Technical information
- Length: 293 km (182 mi)
- Maximum discharge: 35 billion cubic metres per year

The Transitgas Pipeline is a 293-kilometre (182 mi) long natural gas pipeline in Switzerland, which connects Trans Europa Naturgas Pipeline (TENP) from Wallbach at the German border and Gaz de France gas grid from Rodersdorf/Oltingue at the French border with the Snam Rete Gas S.p.A. owned gas grid in Gries Pass, Italy.

== History ==
The company owning the pipeline, Transitgas AG, was established in Zurich on 25 June 1971. The first stage of pipeline between Wallbach and Ruswil came on stream in April 1974. In 1994, the second pipe was laid between Wallbach and Lostorf. Between 1998 and 2003, the pipeline was extended to Italy and a compressor station was built in Ruswil. In 2001 the 55-kilometre long interconnection to France was commissioned.

== Ownership ==
The pipeline is owned by Transitgas AG and operated by FluxSwiss and Swissgas AG. Transitgas AG was owned by Swissgas AG (51%), Eni International BV (46%), and E.ON Ruhrgas AG (3%). However, after settling antitrust proceedings with the European Commission's DG Competition in 2010, ENI divested from Transitgas AG in 2011 and sold its shares to the fully ownership unbundled Belgian Transmission System Operator Fluxys, along with its shares in TENP pipeline system which links Belgium to the Transitgas Pipeline through Germany, for a total of €860 million.

== Antitrust case ==
Since 2007, the European Commission has been probing Eni's alleged restrictive practices on the TAG, Transitgas and TENP pipelines by limiting third parties access to the pipelines. The hearing is set for 27 November 2007.
