= NaTran =

French natural gas pipeline company

GRTgaz
- Logo (2016)
- Type: Subsidiary
- Industry: Oil and gas industry
- Founded: 1 January 2005
- Headquarters: 6, rue Raoul-Nordling, Bois-Colombes, France
- Key people: Thierry Trouvé (CEO)
- Services: Natural gas transmission
- Revenue: 2,093,386,000 (2024)
- Operating income: 489,510,000 (2024)
- Net income: 121,263,000 (2024)
- Number of employees: 2,959 (2015)
- Parent: ENGIE
- Website: grtgaz.com/en

NaTran (formerly GRTgaz) is a French natural gas transmission system operator headquartered in Bois-Colombes, France. It operates a high-pressure gas transmission network and has a public-service mission to ensure the continuity and security of gas transport. In 2025, GRTgaz changed its name to NaTran as part of a strategy focused on the energy transition, including renewable and low-carbon gases, hydrogen and carbon dioxide.

== Status ==
GRTgaz is a public limited company, a subsidiary of the industrial group ENGIE (formerly Gaz de France). It was created on 1 January 2005 in application of European directives on the European electricity and gas market. GRTgaz operates in the regulated energy sector: this means that the rates it charges for its services are public and set by the Government. Its activities are monitored by the Energy Regulatory Commission (CRE). Its board of directors is made up of representatives of the Government and of personnel, independent directors and representatives of the ENGIE Group.

Thierry Trouvé has been CEO of the company from April 26, 2013, taking over from Philippe Boucly.

Even though the GRTgaz activity is a natural monopoly, the company does not manage all natural gas transmission in France: Teréga, formerly TIGF, an affiliate of the Snam / GIC / EDF consortium manages the transmission system in the southwest quadrant of France.

GRTgaz also has an affiliate in Germany, GRTgaz Deutschland (30 employees), which works with Open Grid Europe to operate the MEGAL gas pipeline connecting the Czech Republic, Germany, Austria and France. The pipeline notably supplies natural gas to southern Germany and France.

== Transmission system ==
Since its creation, GRTgaz has owned and operated the transmission network as its industrial equipment and primary asset.

=== Natural gas transmission pipelines managed by GRTgaz ===
The pipeline network managed by GRTgaz covers all of France except the southwest corner. It includes:

- a primary network spanning a distance of 8,346 km at the end of 2015: composed of the largest pipes (diameters from 400 mm to 1,200 mm and pressure from 67.7 to 95 bar, varying periodically),
- a regional network measuring 23,974 m at the end of 2015: from smaller diameters (diameters from 80 mm to 400 mm; pressure from 16 to 40 bar), these gas pipelines supply industrial customers and public grids.

Gas pipelines are almost always buried and typically located in rural areas (90%).

Gas pipelines are marked on the ground level by yellow panels and an easement strip of 5 to 20 m that must remain visible and unobstructed by surrounding vegetation or construction.

== Investments ==
GRTgaz laid out a 10-year investment program to develop and optimize its industrial facilities. The program pursues the following goals:

- network development: load reduction at entry and exit points, increasing transmission capacity;
- meeting public service requirements: notably scaling the regional network in response to consumption spikes during exceptionally cold winters;
- network security: applying security norms, revised in 2006, governing construction on existing gas pipelines and compression stations, in order to protect populations and the environment;
- preserving the environment: applying new and updated environmental regulations to our projects, ISO 14001 certification for compression stations;
- reliability and maintenance of facilities.

GRTgaz already invested over 2 billion euros between 2013 and 2015, notably to develop the "Hauts de France II" and "Arc de Dierrey" projects (180 km) to connect the new Dunkirk LNG terminal or develop interconnections with Belgium, Germany and Spain.

== New energy solutions ==
GRTgaz is active in the renewable gas industry. It makes it possible for the gas network to accept biomethane, which can be produced by anaerobic digestion using household waste, biomass or sewage from purification plants. The first station to connect biomethane to the French transmission network was commissioned in Chagny (Saône-et-Loire) in 2015.

GRTgaz also invested in power to gas conversion, which makes it possible both to use surplus renewable electricity and recycle industrial CO_{2} emissions. Methane produced through methanation can then be injected into the gas transmission system. Decided in 2015, the first industrial pilot of this type, Jupiter 1000, coordinated by GRTgaz, will be built at Fos-sur-Mer, with commissioning planned in 2018.

In the natural gas vehicles (NGV) market, GRTgaz was named by the French association for natural gas vehicles to prepare a roadmap for introducing NGV technology in France by 2020. The goal is to install over 200 new public recharge stations to reach a fleet of 11,000 trucks and 20,000 utility vehicles.
