= European Distributed Energy Partnership =

Research project

European Distributed Energy Partnership (EU-DEEP) is a large research project supported by the European Union (EU) and coordinated by GDF Suez. Started in 2004, the project gathers 41 organizations around the common objective of removing the main barriers to massive deployment of distributed energy resources (DER).

== Background ==
DER are small grid connecting devices that enable decentralized energy to be stored or generated close to the load they serve with the capacity of 10 megawatts (MW) or less. Centralized power plants use energy to transmit power over long distance, so decentralizing the system uses less energy and encompasses a wide variety of different advancing renewable technologies such as Wind power, Solar power, Geothermal power, Biomass, and Biogas into the system.

“European cities are the most advanced in terms of the transition to new energies”, Denis Simonneau, Head of International and European Relations at GDF SUEZ.

The EU-DEEP project, developed by eight different European energy companies, was designed so that most of the technical and non-technical issues which halt a massive deployment of distributed energy resources (DER) in Europe could be eliminated.

== Studies related to the project ==
To address the wide range of challenges associated with operating the electricity system of the future, the leading Transmission system operator (TSOs) and Distribution System Operators (DSOs), manufacturers and research establishments in the EU have formed a consortium of 18 partners to undertake a 4-year project code named FENIX whose overall aim is: "To conceptualize, design and demonstrate a technical architecture and commercial framework that would enable DER based systems to become the solution for the future cost efficient, secure and sustainable EU electricity supply system."

"The main concern is to provide answers to tackle the different types of barrier to DER deployment." There is three main types of barriers to the DER deployment which are technology barriers, market barriers, and regulatory barriers. Feem was one of the EU-DEEP partner that was responsible for developing Regulatory Models for the integration of DER. Focusing on FEEM's research, they had work on Demand Response. The main point of the work was to show "how to correlate price patterns to different generation technologies and validation of the three Business Models."

== EU-DEEP Partners ==
The EU-DEEP is made up of forty-two partners from sixteen countries. The partners are different from one another as they include energy operators, industrial manufacturers, research centers, academics, professionals and national agencies. Each partner also has different capabilities from the development of electric equipments to the analysis of the energy markets mechanisms.

Utilities
Country	Partner
France	GDF SUEZ
Spain	Iberdrola
Cyprus	EAC
Latvia	Latvenergo
Belgium	Tractebel
Germany	RWE Energy
Greece	EPA Attiki
Germany	GASAG

Research Centers
Country	Partner
Sweden	IEA/LTH
Italy	FEEM
Hungary	VEIKI
Latvia	RTU
Belgium	Laborelec
Turkey	TUBITAK
Greece	AUTh
Spain	CENTER
Sweden	Enersearch
France	SEAES
Spain	IIE-UPV
Greece	ICCS/NTUA
Finland	VTT
Spain	Labein
Sweden	STRI
Belgium	KULeuven
Cyprus	FIT
Greece	CRES
England	Imperial College

Manufacturers
Country	Partner
England	Bowman
Germany	MTU
Germany	Siemens PTD
Greece	Heletel
Czech Republic	TEDOM
France	SAFT
Austria	Siemens PSE
Greece	ANCO

Professionals
Country	Partner
France	Technofi
France	Transénergie
Germany	Axiom
Poland	EnergoProjekt
Germany	ENPROM

Regulators
Country	Partner
Poland	KAPE
Greece	RAE

== See also ==
- Energy law#European Union
