= Dry Creek Power Station =

Gas-fired power station in South Australia

- Country: Australia
- Location: Dry Creek, South Australia
- Coordinates: 34.8475°S 138.5818°E
- Status: Operational
- Commission date: 1973
- Owners: Engie Energy International; Mitsui & Co.
- Operator: Engie Energy International

Thermal power station
- Primary fuel: Natural gas
- Turbine technology: Open cycle gas turbine

Power generation
- Units operational: 3
- Make and model: gas turbine (3)
- Nameplate capacity: 156 MW

External links
- Website: www.engie.com.au/home/what-we-do/our-assets/synergen/

Dry Creek Power Station is a power station at Dry Creek in the northern suburbs of Adelaide, South Australia. It is owned and operated by Synergen Power, a joint venture of Engie and Mitsui. The power station has three open cycle gas turbines, each rated at 52 MW. It was commissioned in 1973–1974 by the Electricity Trust of South Australia.

As well as peaking electricity generation, the power station also provides ancillary services to support electricity grid stability. Dry Creek Power Station was established around 1978. It receives gas from the Moomba Adelaide Pipeline System. In 2018, the operators of Dry Creek Power Station were fined A$60,000 for failing to respond to instructions from AEMO during a blackout caused by faults elsewhere in the network.
