= Trans Europa Naturgas Pipeline =

Gas pipeline in Germany

- Location of Trans Europa Naturgas Pipeline

Location
- Country: Germany
- Direction: north–south
- Start: Aachen
- Passes through: Stolberg; Mittelbrunn
- To: Schwörstadt

General information
- Type: natural gas
- Partners: Fluxys; Open Grid Europe
- Operator: Fluxys TENP GmbH
- Construction started: 1972
- Commissioned: 1974

Technical information
- Length: 968 km (601 mi)
- Maximum discharge: 15.5 billion cubic meters per year
- Diameter: 950 mm (37 in)
- No. of compressor stations: 4

The Trans Europa Naturgas Pipeline (TENP) is a natural gas pipeline which runs from the German-Netherlands border to the German-Swiss border. It carries North Sea natural gas from the Netherlands to Italy and Switzerland. It also provides natural gas for North Rhine-Westphalia, Rhineland-Palatinate and Baden-Württemberg federal states.

== History ==
The TENP was built in 1972–1974, and upgraded in 1978 and 2009.

== Route ==
The pipeline runs from the German-Netherlands border near Aachen to the German-Swiss border near Schwörstadt. In the German-Swiss border it is connected with the Transitgas Pipeline. En route, in Stolberg the pipeline is connected with the pipeline from Zeebrugge and in Mittelbrunn it is connected with the transport system of the MEGAL pipeline system which transports Russian natural gas from the German-Czech border to German regions and France.

== Technical features ==
The length of the pipeline is 968 kilometres (601 mi) and it runs in two lines. It has a capacity of 15.5 billion cubic meters per year which the operator intends to increase by 2 billion cubic meters per year. The diameter of pipeline varies from 900 to 950 millimetres (35 to 37 in). The pipeline comprises four compressor stations.

== Company ==
The pipeline is owned and operated by Trans Europa Naturgas Pipeline GmbH & Co. KG, a joint venture of Open Grid Europe (51%) and Fluxys (49%). It is operated by Open Grid Europe.

== Antitrust case ==
Since 2007, the European Commission has been probing Eni's alleged restrictive practices on the TAG, Transitgas and TENP pipelines by limiting third parties access to the pipelines. The hearing is set for 27 November 2007.
