= Ozonia =

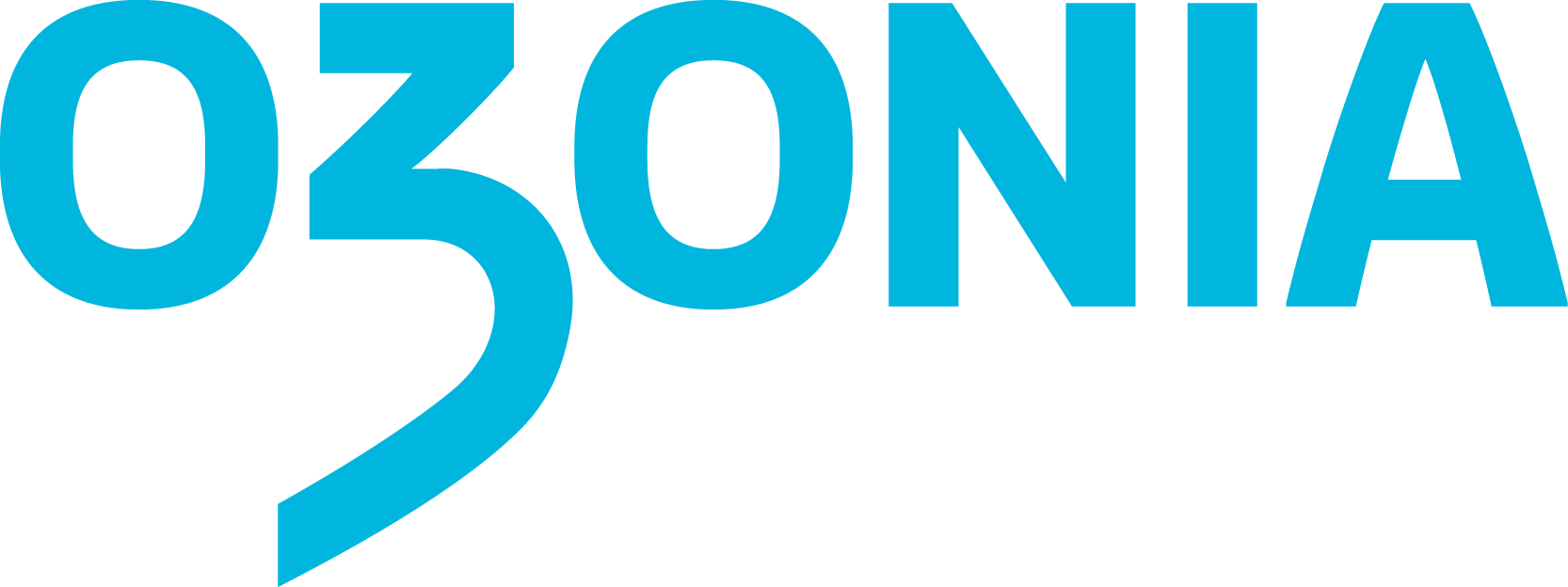
- Industry: Water treatment
- Founded: 20.06.1990
- Headquarters: Zürich, Switzerland
- Area served: Worldwide
- Products: Ozone, UV and AOP water treatment technologies
- Number of employees: 240
- Parent: Degrémont, Suez Environnement
- Subsidiaries: Ozonia North America, Ozonia France, Ozonia Russia, Triogen UK, Ozonia China, Ozonia Korea, Ozonia Japan
- Website: www.ozonia.com

Ozonia is a multinational water treatment equipment manufacturer headquartered in Zürich, Switzerland.

It operates under the company, Degrémont, which is a subsidiary of Suez Environnement, a French-based utility company which operates largely in the water treatment and waste management sectors.

Ozonia specializes in manufacturing systems that deliver ozone, ultraviolet (UV) and advanced oxidation process (AOP) technologies in the municipal, industrial and leisure markets.

== History ==
1990 Degrémont and Air Liquide acquired ABB's (formerly BBC's) ozone department. This was the genesis of Ozonia.

1991 The Ozonia brand was officially launched at the International Ozone Association (IOA) Congress in Monaco. As a partnership between Degrémont and Air Liquide, Ozonia offices are opened in Zürich and in Paris.

Also, Ozonia's first big installation (360 kg O_{3}/h), a pulp and paper bleaching application, was installed for Union Camp in the US. Ozonia was the first to develop a technology based on an oxygen recovery loop, enabling it to recycle 80% of the process oxygen needs.

1992 Ozonia installed the first project using new ceramic "AT dielectrics". The Contra Costa Water Treatment Plant in San Francisco (200 kg O_{3}/h) illustrated the ability to produce higher concentration ozone while reducing oxygen consumption.

1993 Ozonia North America was founded after Ozonia AG acquired "Griffin". The new American subsidiary manufactured ozone generators compliant with the North American standards.

In the same year, to expand the Ozonia product line with small ozone and UV units, Triogen, based in Glasgow, joined Ozonia and the Degrémont group. In 2019, Triogen was sold to Bio-UV.

1996 To satisfy the rapidly growing Asian market, Ozonia opened an office in Seongnam City, South Korea, after acquiring a majority stake in "CHAMP Ozone".

1997 Agreements between the Swiss and Russian governments promoted the use of ozone for water treatment throughout Russia. Ozonia Russia was created was created and opened its office in Nizhny Novgorod.

1998 As business continued to grow in Asia, Ozonia opened an office in Tokyo to cater to Japanese customers.

2000 Daegu City in South Korea (350 kg O_{3}/h) becomes the first project in the world where ozone is used for the treatment of wastewater. The contract was celebrated at Ozonia's 10th anniversary.

2005 Degrémont bought out Air Liquide's ownership stake and became the sole shareholder of Ozonia. Ozonia expanded its presence to seven countries: Switzerland, France, United States, Great Britain, Russia, South Korea and Japan.

2005 The widespread use of ultraviolet (UV) technology became a focus for the group. Infilco Degrémont and Ozonia form a UV disinfection group to market the Infilco's Aquaray UV product line.

2006 Ozonia unveiled the MODIPAC, a technological breakthrough in ozone power supply. The MODIPAC increased power while reducing footprint and eliminating harmonics.

2008 Ozonia launched an innovative new dielectric technology: the "Intelligent Gap System (IGS)". The IGS technology drastically improved the efficiency and energy consumption. As a result, Ozonia won the International Water Association's (IWA) Project Innovation Award.

2009 To expand its operations due to the growth in the leisure market, Triogen opened a new facility in Glasgow, Scotland.

2010 Ozonia opened a new "Process Applications" department. The department showcased Ozonia's knowledge in various applications including pulp bleaching, wastewater and aquaculture, with a goal to better educate clients.

Ozonia North America also opened a new facility in Leonia, New Jersey, to address the growing ozone and UV markets in North America.

2012 Ozonia opened a new production center based in Zürich, Dübendorf. The new facility increased production capacity and efficiency, and improved the quality and the ability to engineer project specific equipment.

Micropollutants: The "ARA Neugut" wastewater treatment plant in Zürich-Dübendorf became the first wastewater treatment plant to treat micropollutants in Switzerland. The project represented a key step for future projects in Switzerland and around the world.

2013 Ozonia opened another new production center in Tianjin-Wuqing, China. The new center is a major milestone that allows Ozonia to design and manufactures ozone generators locally that address the Chinese market.

== Activities ==
Ozonia manufactures ozone, ultraviolet (UV) and advanced oxidation process (AOP) technologies and systems for water treatment.

=== Ozone ===
It is a well-known fact that ozone, a very strong oxidant, is used in water treatment disinfection.

It shows an extensive range of applications; drinking water, wastewater, water disinfection, color removal, micropollutants, pulp & paper bleaching, process water, ballast water, cooling towers, beverage and water bottling, aquaculture, aquariums (zoos), cyanide regeneration, food/ produce/ poultry, swimming pools, ultrapure water and many more. It is also used for the deodorization of waste air emitted from water plants and for the reduction of sludge from biological wastewater treatment (sewage treatment).

The technique that enables the ozone generators to produce ozone at an industrial scale consists of applying a corona discharge or dielectric barrier discharge to dry gas that contains oxygen.

Water treatment using ozone is environmentally friendly especially compared to the chlorination disinfection method. This is due to the fact that the residual ozone molecules detach from oxygen molecules after the oxidation process. Thanks to this characteristic of ozone, there is no hazardous by-products produced afterwards.

=== Ultraviolet (UV) disinfection ===
Ultraviolet(UV) is an electromagnetic radiation found in sunlight.

UV disinfection is environmentally safe and recognized as highly effective on inactivating a wide range of pathogens, including viruses, bacteria and parasites. It is also known for its capability of successfully eliminating hazardous and environmentally unacceptable chemicals such as chlorine and other associated disinfection by-products.

UV also covers a number of applications: drinking water, food and beverage, aquaculture, power generation, cooling water microelectronics, pharmaceutical, wastewater disinfection, reuse wastewater, combined sewer overflows (CSO) & sanitary sewer overflows (SSO).

In the UV-C light spectrum (200-280 nm), the wavelength 254 nm has been proven to be the most efficient wavelength to inactivate micro-organisms by damaging the nucleic acids (DNA and RNA), which disrupts the organism's ability to replicate.

Main advantages of UV disinfection are such as short contact times for pathogens to be inactivated and effectiveness on protozoa cysts and other chlorine resistant organisms. UV has another advantage over other disinfectants because no chemicals are added to the water being treated and that no disinfection by-products are formed. These advantages make UV disinfection a top choice for the disinfection of municipal and industrial wastewater and drinking water. Due to UV systems' small footprint, the UV equipment can be easily integrated into most existing treatment plants.

=== Advanced oxidation processes (AOP) ===
Advanced oxidation processes (AOP) are chemical processes used for treatment of water and wastewater. AOPs further improve chemical oxidation processes by combining three proven treatment technologies – ozone, UV and hydrogen peroxide – to create in-situ highly reactive hydroxyl radicals (^{.}OH) for elimination of organic pollutants.

AOPs are aqueous phase oxidation methods consisting of highly reactive species used in the oxidative destruction of target pollutants. AOP creates a more powerful and less selective secondary oxidant, hydroxyl radicals, in the water. This secondary oxidant can cause the oxidation of most organic compounds until they are fully mineralized as carbon dioxide and water. The hydroxyl radical has a much higher oxidation potential than ozone or hydrogen peroxide and usually reacts at least one million times faster, thus leading to a smaller contact time and footprint.

This powerful AOP disinfection method can be applied to micropollutants removal, organic pollutants removal, drinking water treatment, municipal and industrial wastewater treatment, groundwater remediation and many more. Due to industrial and demographic pressures, the use of AOP in water treatment is expanding for a number of critical uses including the oxidation or removal of industrial chemicals, pharmaceuticals, endocrine disrupting compounds (EDC's), personal care products (PCP's), pesticides, toxic compounds, pathogens, persistent organic matter, and odor, color and taste.

== Group companies ==
Ozonia operates under the company, Degrémont, whose mother company is Suez Environnement.

=== Suez Environnement ===
Suez Environnement S.A. (Euronext: SEV) is a French-based utility company which operates largely in the water treatment and waste management sectors. Formerly an operating division of Suez, the company was spun out as a stand-alone entity as part of the merger to form GDF Suez on 22 July 2008. Suez Environnement shares are listed on the Euronext exchanges in Paris and Brussels. The company has its head office in the 8th arrondissement of Paris. As of 2012 Suez Environnement employs 79,549 people worldwide with revenues of €15.1 billion.

=== Degrémont ===
Degrémont is a company specializing in the production of drinking water, and in the treatment of sewage and sludge. After starting as a family business in France in 1939, it has since become a subsidiary of Suez Environnement. As of 2012 Degrémont employs 4,600 people in 70 countries and generates annual revenues of €1.4 billion.
