= Laborelec =

- Industry: Research, Energy
- Founded: 1962
- Headquarters: Linkebeek, Brussels, Belgium
- Number of employees: 250
- Parent: Electrabel
- Website: laborelec.com :: Main-home

Laborelec (/ləˈbɔːrəlɛk/ lə-BOR-ə-lek) is a research center and technical service provider with 250 researchers and experts, specialized in electrical power technology and sustainable energy. The company is based in Linkebeek near Brussels, Belgium and has branch offices in Maastricht, Netherlands and Wuppertal, Germany. It was established in 1962, from a merger of the laboratories of Sofina, Interescaut and the Belgian Electrotechnical Committee (BEC/CEB), in order to support Belgian electricity companies with research, development and specialized services.

Today, Laborelec is a Belgian C.V. whose main shareholder is Electrabel, which is a part of the French company Engie. Other shareholders are Cofely Services, Tractebel Engineering and several Belgian distribution system operators. In 2011, its turnover was almost €50,000,000.

== International Activities ==
Laborelec is an international consultant and service provider in electrical power technology. In 2009, the company participated in projects in Europe, the Middle-East, North and South America, Asia and in Antarctica, where Laborelec implemented the zero-emission energy and utility systems of the Princess Elisabeth Antarctic station realized by the International Polar Foundation.
