= E.ON Gaz Romania =

Romanian natural gas company

E.ON Gaz Romania SA
- Type: Private company
- Industry: Natural gas
- Founded: 1975
- Defunct: December 31, 2010
- Fate: Merged with E.ON Moldova Furnizare to form E.ON Energie România
- Headquarters: Târgu Mureş, Romania
- Products: Natural gas
- Revenue: US$1.1 billion (2007)
- Number of employees: 500 (2007)
- Parent: E.ON

E.ON Gaz Romania was a Romanian supply company in the gas industry, specialising in natural gas supply. In 2010, it merged with E.ON Moldova Furnizare to form E.ON Energie România.

== History ==
The base of the distribution company was laid in 1975. Based on a government decision issued in 2000, The National Gas Company (Societatea Naţională de Gaze Naturale Romgaz) was reorganised according to the services provided, thus resulting DistriGaz Nord, a company which was taken over by E.ON Group in June 2005, further to the acquisition of the majority of shares by E.ON Ruhrgas AG. Starting with April 2006, the company repositions itself on the specific market, by adopting a new trading name testifying its affiliation to E.ON Group, more exactly E.ON Gaz Romania.

On 1 July 2007, in compliance with Romanian legal requirements aligned to the EU law, a legal separation of the supply activity from the distribution activity came into force. Thus, two legally independent companies were created: E.ON Gaz România, natural gas supply company and E.ON Gaz Distribuţie, natural gas distribution company. In November 2010, the shareholders of E.ON Gaz Romania and E.ON Moldova Furnizare approved the merger to form E.ON Energie România. The merger was effective from 31. December 2010.

With a tradition traced back to over 30 years, E.ON Gaz Romania is one of the major players on this market, providing natural gas for more than 20 counties in the northern part of the country, the gas supply activity being performed in Transylvania, Moldavia and Banat. The customers of E.ON Gaz Romania, amounting to over 1.2 million, 95% thereof being residentials and 5% industrial customers, can be found in approximately 1,007 localities both in urban and rural areas, on a surface of approx. 122,600 km^{2}.

=== History of natural gas exploration ===
On the present-day territory of Romania, the first natural gas deposit was discovered in 1908, in Sărmăşel, Mureș County (then in Austria-Hungary), further to geological researches on potassium salts. A prodigious period followed for the gas distribution business and the year 1941 marks the construction of the first natural gas pipeline from Măneşti to Bucharest, while the following year a main pipeline is built for the transportation of natural gas from Transylvania to the capital city.

== Accidents ==
- 2007 Zalău explosion
- 2012 Sighetu Marmației explosions

== See also ==
- Distrigaz Sud
