= Philip Cox (businessman) =

Philip Gotsall Cox CBE is the chief executive officer of International Power, the energy company based in London, formed from National Power when Innogy de-merged from it in April 2000.

== Early life and education ==
Philip Gotsall Cox attended Bishop Vesey's Grammar School in Sutton Coldfield, Birmingham.

At Queens' College, Cambridge, he completed an MA in geography.

== Career ==
Cox joined Price Waterhouse in 1973 as a chartered accountant, moving to Lucas in 1977. From 1981 to 1988 he worked for small engineering and marketing companies. He was Chief Financial Officer at Siebe from 1988-99. In 1999 he became Senior Vice-President of Operational Planning at Invensys, in the same year that Invensys was formed from Siebe merging with BTR.

In May 2000 he became chief financial officer at International Power when the company was formed, becoming CEO in December 2003 when David Crane left to join NRG Energy.

== Honours ==
Cox was appointed Commander of the Order of the British Empire (CBE) in the 2013 New Year Honours for services to the energy industry.

== Other roles ==
He subsequently took several non-executive and chair roles.
