= Degrémont =

French water treatment company

Société Degrémont
- Type: Public
- Industry: Water treatment
- Founded: 1939
- Headquarters: Rueil-Malmaison, France
- Key people: Laurent Besse (Chairman), Marie-CécileDE CHEZELLES (Deputy CEO), Emmanuel Jacquot (Deputy CEO), Pascal Vizier (Deputy CEO)
- Revenue: €1.520 billion
- Number of employees: 4,600
- Subsidiaries: Ameriwater, Aquasource, Innoplana, Triogen, Anderson, Infilco, Ozonia, WPT
- Website: www.degremont.com

Degrémont is a company specializing in the production of drinking water, and in the treatment of sewage and sludge. After starting as a family business in France in 1939, it has since become a subsidiary of Suez Environment, employing 4,600 people in 70 countries, and generating annual revenues of €1.520 billion (2010 figures).

== History ==
Founded by Gilbert Degrémont in 1939 on the outskirts of Paris, as a follow-up of his father Emille Degrémont's water treatment company established 1904 at Le Cateau-Cambrésis, the Degrémont company soon entered the international market, with contracts in countries such as Egypt, Iran, Indonesia and Peru. In 1972, the company merged with SGEA to become Lyonnaise des Eaux, which later became part of the Suez Group. Today, it is a subsidiary of Suez Environment and has operations worldwide. Gilbert Degrémont’s grandfather, Adalbert, had already set up a mechanical engineering plant in the North of France in 1870, which was converted by his son, Emile, into a water treatment business. After completing an engineering degree in agronomics, Gilbert launched the Degrémont company that is still in existence today.

In 2023, Degrémont was selected for the complete on-site reconstruction of the current Haliotis plant in Nice. The contract is valued at several hundred million euros.

== Drinking water ==
Degrémont is involved in the production of drinking water from groundwater or surface water in industrialized countries and the developing world. Its activities also include the desalination of seawater or brackish water for use as either drinking water or in irrigation. In all cases the water it produces is expected to meet the regulatory standards in operation in the relevant country.

Degrémont has built 10,000 plants drinking water treatment plants around the world, and 250 desalination plants.

To produce drinking water, it uses a range of different technologies such as settling, flottation, media filters, membrane ultrafiltration, ozone purification or ultraviolet disinfection systems. Its desalination plants use the reverse osmosis technology.

== Sewage and sludge treatment ==
The company is also involved in the treatment of sewage and sludge, which is a growing problem for urban areas in particular. It relies on a range of different technologies including physical, chemical or biological treatments, ozonization, membrane bioreactors, sand filters etc. Most wastewater is treated for use in irrigation or for use in industrial cooling systems. Degrémont has built 2,500 sewage treatment plants with the capacity to recycle 2.4 million cubic meters per day.

Sludge treatment is focused, first, on reducing the volumes of sludge produced and, second, processing it for reuse, mainly in agriculture. This is done through digestion, incineration, thickening, dewatering or drying, all of which can also lead to biogas recovery for use in energy production.

== Activities ==
Degrémont estimates that 1 billion people are served by its 10,000 facilities around the world. These include 3,000 drinking water plants and 2,500 water treatment stations for urban wastewater. It carries out its activities using a number of different business models.

- It designs, finances and builds facilities for the production of drinking water and for the treatment and recycling of sewage and sludge. This includes desalination plants that notably use reverse osmosis technology to create drinking water from seawater.
- It can also operate those facilities for its customers in the public or private sector when contracted to do so.
- Under its Build-Operate-Transfer contracts, Degrémont is responsible for financing and running facilities during the contract period (up to 25 years). Ownership is then transferred to the customer.
- It sells equipment to facilities owned or run by third parties.

== Company culture ==
Since 1951, Degrémont has published The Water Treatment Handbook, a book containing the company’s combined knowledge of water chemistry and water treatment. There have been 10 French editions and 7 English editions (Lavoisier), and it has been published in 10 languages in total. The company encourages its managers to participate in numerous international conferences and congresses, where they share Degrémont technologies.

Degrémont has obtained GoodCorporation certification, a responsible business practice assessment system looking at the way an organisation is managed in relation to its employees, its customers, its suppliers, its shareholders, the environment and even its contribution to the community.

== R&D ==
Degrémont spent €13.5 million on R&D in 2010, and has filed over 500 patents since its creation. Recent investments have focused on improving the energy performance of plants and ultrafiltration membranes.
