= Gilbert Degrémont =

Gilbert Degrémont (born in 1908 in Le Cateau, Nord, France, died on November 22, 1974) was a French water treatment expert and the founder of Degrémont SA, a water treatment company.

== Early life and career ==
Gilbert Degrémont was the grandson of Aldebert Degrémont, head of a mechanical construction workshop in Le Cateau, in the north of France from 1870 until the early 20th century. In 1904, Aldebert retired, leaving the business to his son Émile, who had created his own company, Établissements Émile Degrémont, focusing on water treatment for the industry.

Gilbert Degrémont learned mechanics while working in his father’s and grandfather’s workshops and factories. He completed agriculture studies at the Institute of Agronomy in Rennes in 1927. After military service at a hot air balloon base, he joined his father and his brother Étienne in the industrial water purification business in Le Cateau. He successfully installed an iron filtration system for the water supply in Saigon-Cholon (now Ho Chi Minh City) in Vietnam in 1933.

== Degrémont ==
His father Émile retired in 1939, and the company was split between Gilbert and Étienne, who ran the mechanical construction workshop in Le Cateau. Gilbert founded Degrémont-Traitement des eaux with offices and workshops in Levallois-Perret. The company focused solely on water treatment.

World War II slowed business in Le Cateau, as Allied bombings destroyed the canal system used to transport goods such as steel, vital to the construction of water filters. When a barge containing 300 tons of steel was abandoned in a silt-filled canal, Degrémont bought the barge and its contents from the steel manufacturer for a tiny sum, then mobilized teams of workers to remove the steel within a week. The steel cache lasted the company six months in a time when competitors had none.

Degrémont formed close working relationships with three men, with whom he would grow the business over the subsequent decades: Pierre Duflot, who ran the financial part of the business, Sarkis Balabanian, who focused on foreign expansion, and Roger Leviel, chief engineer and specialist in chemistry and water.

After World War II, he successfully installed a water filtering system for the city of St Etienne. The system used self-cleaning filters to treat 2,000 cubic metres per hour (530,000 gal/h).

In 1949, he moved the company to its newly built headquarters in the western Paris suburb of Rueil-Malmaison, where it is still located today.

Degrémont soon entered the international market. In order to be readily recognized overseas, he designed the dove logo that is still the company’s trademark. The logo, which first appeared in 1949, was modeled after Picasso’s dove of peace.

His company won a water treatment contract for Cairo, Egypt, in 1948. He was notorious for his inability to speak English (a characteristic which many managers loyally follow today), but he spoke Spanish well enough to win business first in Spain and later in South America, notably in Cali, Colombia, and Lima, Peru, in the 1950s.

Meanwhile, Sarkis Balabanian handled expansion within English-speaking countries.

Large water treatment contracts were signed in Tehran, Jakarta, and many major cities worldwide between 1950 and 1970.

Gilbert Degrémont retired from the company he founded in 1972, after it merged with SLEE, later known as Lyonnaise des eaux, which merged with Suez in 1997.

Today, the company remains a world leader in water treatment.

== Water Treatment Handbook ==
In the early 1940s, Degrémont and chief engineer Roger Leviel wrote the first edition of Le Mémento Technique de l’Eau, a book containing their combined knowledge of water chemistry and water treatment. At first only internally distributed, the first public edition was published in French in 1951. There have been 10 French-language editions since then. The Water Treatment Handbook, the title in English, is currently in its 7th English-language edition, published by Lavoisier in 2007.
