= Gries Pass =

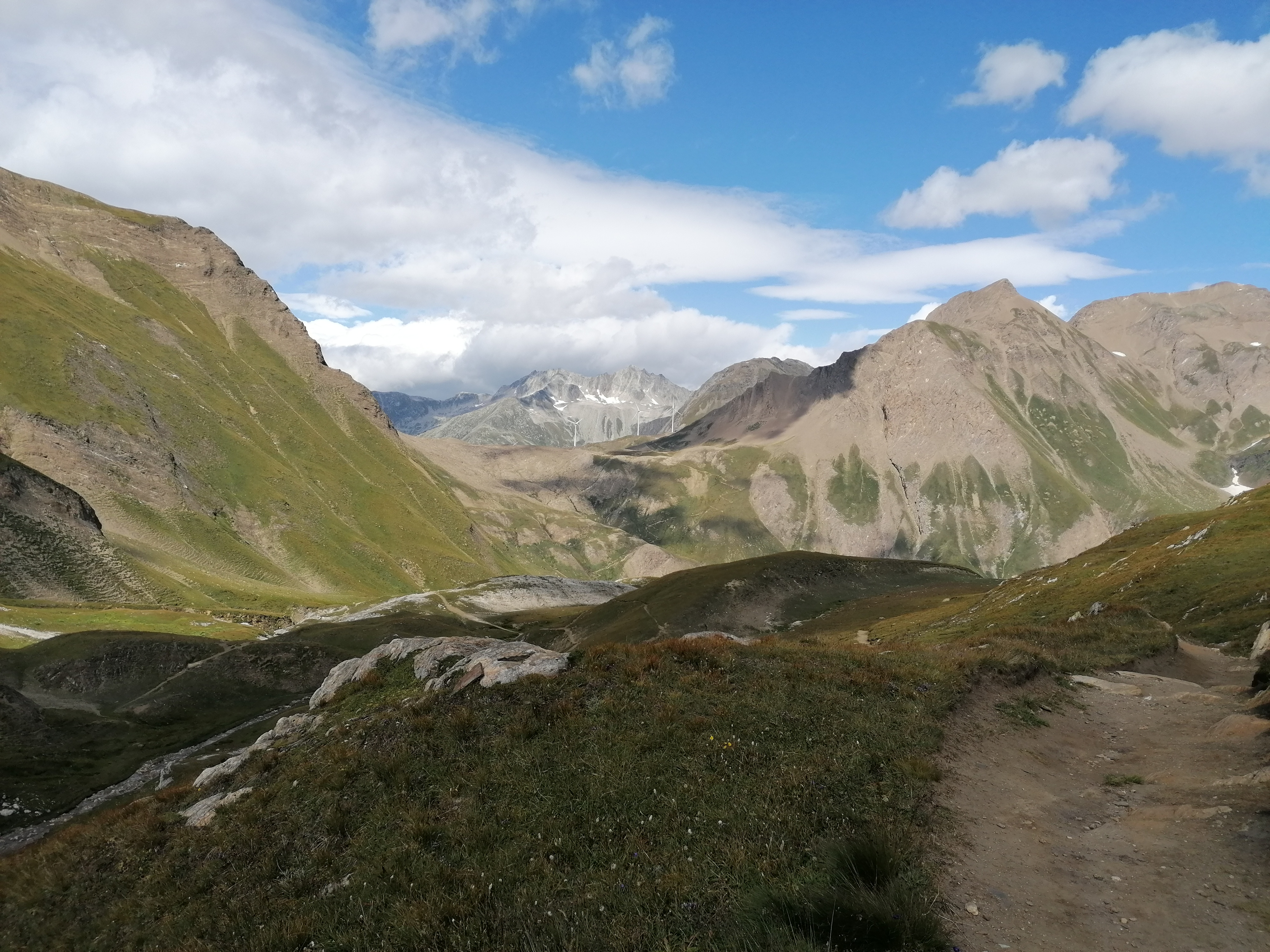
- Gries Pass in August 2021

- Location within Alps
- Elevation: 2,469 metres (8,100 ft)

Third Approach
- Location: Switzerland–Italy border
- Range: Lepontine Alps, Alps
- Coordinates: 46°27′14″N 8°22′26″E

Gries Pass (Italian: Passo del Gries, German: Griespass, French: Col de Gries) is a 2,469-metre-high (8,100 ft) mountain pass between Valais, Switzerland, and Formazza, Italy. There is no road over the pass, from Nufenen Pass the paved road ends and a bridle path leads over to the Italian side. A high-pressure gas pipeline runs over the pass, coming from the North Sea to Italy.

== Geography ==
The Gries Pass marks the border between Italy and Switzerland, near the Nufenen Pass. It connects Formazza with the canton of Valais or more broadly Goms with the Ossola Valley. It lies west of the Camosci point (3,044 m [9,987 ft]) and is flanked to the east by the Corno Gries.

== See also ==
- List of mountain passes
- List of mountain passes in Switzerland
