= Trans Austria Gas Pipeline =

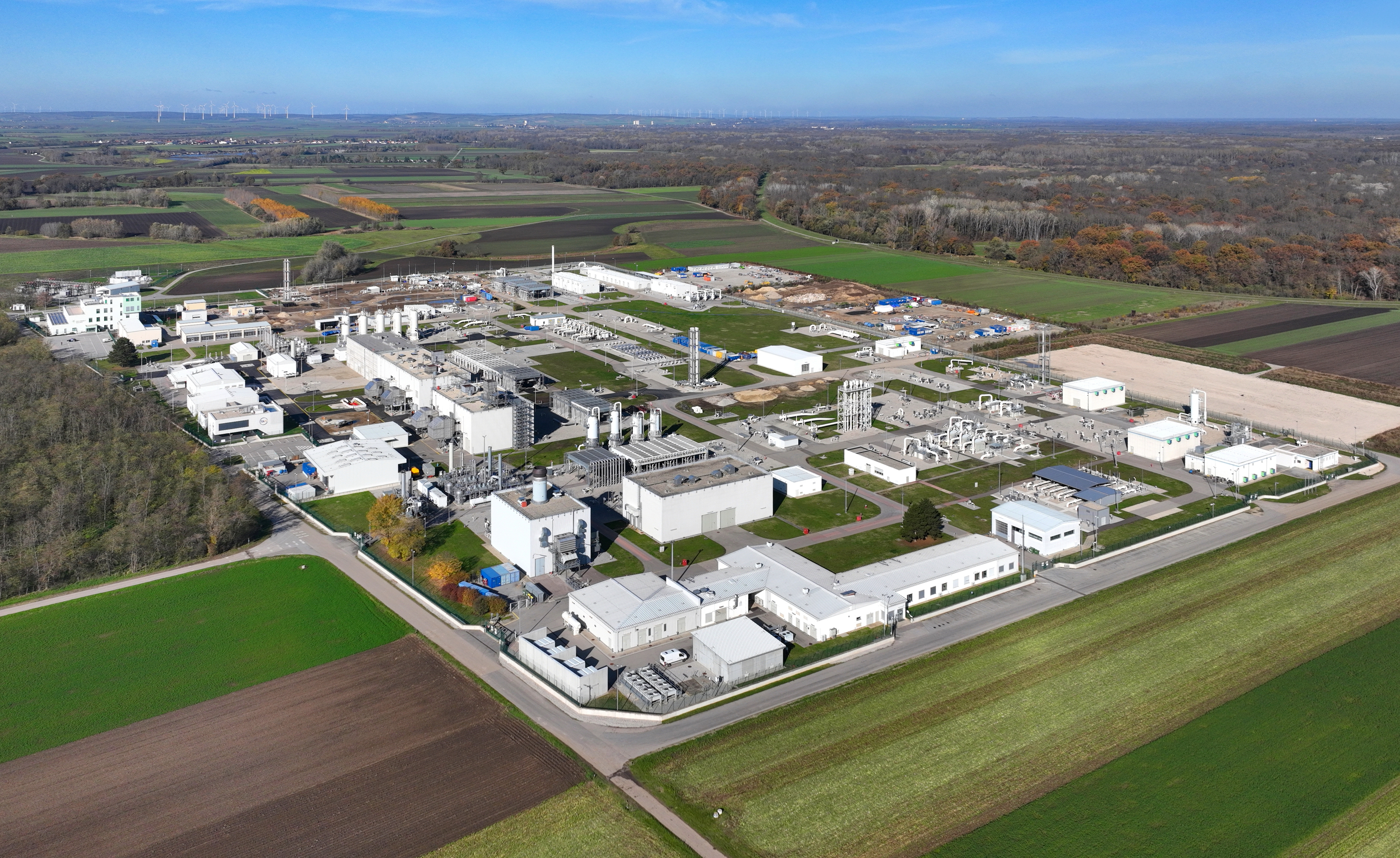
- Baumgarten gas hub, the start of the Trans Austria Gas
- Location of Trans Austria Gas Pipeline

Location
- Country: Austria
- Direction: east-west
- Start: Baumgarten an der March
- Passes through: Eggendorf, Grafendorf, St. Margrethen, Weitendorf, Ettendorf, Waisenberg, Ebenthal, Finkenstein am Faaker See
- To: Arnoldstein

General information
- Type: natural gas
- Partners: Eni, OMV
- Operator: Trans Austria Gasleitung GmbH

Technical information
- Length: 380 km (240 mi)
- Maximum discharge: 47.5 billion cubic meters per year

The Trans Austria Gas (TAG) pipeline is a natural gas pipeline that leads from the Slovak-Austrian border at Baumgarten an der March to Arnoldstein in the south, near the border with Italy. Natural gas originating from Russia is transported to and used in Italy and Austria. In addition, it supplies Slovenia through the SOL Pipeline System (Süd - Ost - Leitung), which branch-off at Weitendorf.

== Technical features ==
The pipeline is 380 kilometres (240 mi) long. The original two lines date back to the 1960s, but in 2006 the pipeline was extended by adding the third line. The extension cost US$157 million.

The capacity of the pipeline is 41 billion cubic meters (bcm) of natural gas annually. The construction of two additional compression stations increased the capacity to 47.5 bcm at end 2008.

== Pipeline company ==
The pipeline is managed by Trans Austria Gasleitung GmbH (TAG GmbH), a partnership of Eni and OMV. Eni owns 89% of TAG and manages the pipeline, with OMV holding the remainder.

== Antitrust case ==
Since 2007, the European Commission has been probing Eni's alleged restrictive practices on the TAG, Transitgas and TENP pipelines by limiting third parties access to the pipelines. The hearing is set for 27 November 2007. To end the case, Eni is studying the possible sale of the pipeline.
