= EVBox =

Duch electric vehicle charging station company

- Industry: Electric vehicle infrastructure
- Founded: 2010
- Headquarters: Bordeaux, France
- Key people: Eric Stempin (CEO)
- Number of employees: 110+ (2026)
- Parent: Lafip
- Website: evbox.com

EVBox is an electric vehicle supply equipment company based in Bordeaux, France. Founded in 2010 by Bram van der Leur and Huub Rothengatter, EVBox manufactures and distributes electric vehicle (EV) charging stations and charging management software. As of December 2020, it has a global installed base of over 190,000 charging points.

In October 2024, parent company Engie announced shutting down EVBox after sustained losses of at least 100 million euro yearly over the previous years and failing to find a buyer.

Since 2025, the company has refocused on fast and ultra-fast (DC) charging. Strategic Realignment The Bordeaux site (HQ) is dedicated to the research, development and production of EVBox DC charging stations.

== Company ==
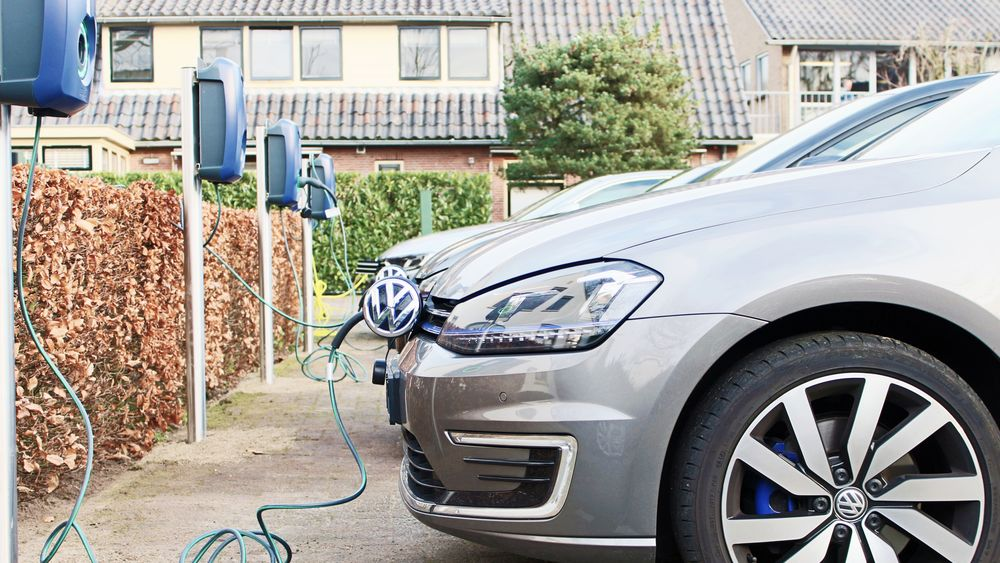
EVBox HomeLine In Apartment Building

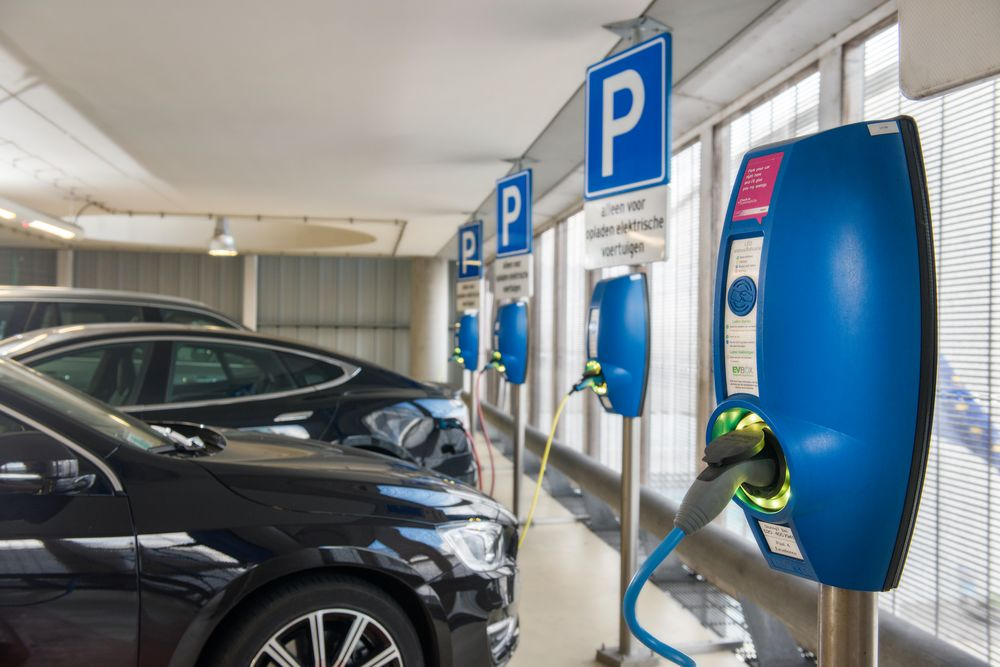
EVBox BusinessLine Charging Station in Amsterdam Schiphol Airport

EVBox Group is a provider of charging solutions for electric vehicles (EVs). Founded in 2010, EVBox started during the early growth of EVs market. In 2014, Gilde Equity Management Benelux became EVBox's new major shareholder to help EVBox expand internationally. In 2017, EVBox was acquired by ENGIE Digital, a subset of the French multinational electric utility company Engie. In July 2018, EVBox acquired French fast charging manufacturer, EVTronic.

In 2025, EVBox was acquired by La Financière de Pessac (LAFIP), led by Éric Stempin. Since then, the company has been based in the Bordeaux area.

== Products ==
EVBox's product portfolio includes hardware (charging stations and accessories), software (charging management systems) and services (maintenance and mobility services).

=== Hardware ===
EVBox offers DC fast charging stations:

- EVBox Troniq Compact Modular (DC - a fast-charging station capable of charging up to 200 kW)
- EVBox DepotBox (DC - a compact solution capable of charging up to 500 kW)
- EVBox PowerHub (DC - a compact solution capable of charging up to 480 kW)
- EVBox Nomad (a mobile DC fast-charging station delivering up to 80 kW)
- EVBox Troniq High Power (DC - a fast-charging station capable of charging up to 400 kW)
- EVBox Troniq Ultra High Power (DC - a fast-charging station capable of charging up to 1 MW)

== Partners ==
EVBox distributes its DC charging solutions across Europe through a network of partners, including distributors, value-added resellers, installers, electrical contractors, and charge point operators (CPOs). These partners provide services ranging from equipment distribution and installation to commissioning, operation, and maintenance of EV charging infrastructure.

EVBox charging solutions are deployed across a variety of applications, including public charging networks, commercial and retail locations, fleet and depot charging, and high-power charging for electric trucks and other heavy-duty vehicles. The company has developed partnerships with charging operators and energy companies across Europe. In France, EVBox works with operators such as Dream Energy and Bump on the deployment of fast and high-power charging infrastructure. EVBox charging infrastructure is also deployed in Monaco in cooperation with SMEG.

== Awards ==
In 2016, EVBox was ranked 22nd in the Deloitte Technology Fast 50 in the Netherlands and was awarded 1st place in the CleanTech sector. It made its mark with a growth rate of 466% over the previous three years.

In 2017, EVBox was named a Grid Edge Award winner by Greentech Media and highlighted as an industry leader focused on paving the way towards tomorrow's distributed energy systems.

In 2018, EVBox was named a CES Innovations Award Honoree in the category of Smart Energy with the Elvi product. Later that year, it was also featured on the Inc. 5000 Europe List of fastest-growing private companies, alongside companies like Intuit, Timberland, and Microsoft.

In 2019, EVBox was named a leading provider of Public Charging Network and EV Charging Services by Navigant Research. Later in 2019, EVBox won a CES Innovations Award, an iF Design Award, and a Red Dot Award with EVBox Iqon.

In 2023, EVBox Livo won the Red Dot Award for its outstanding product design.

In 2024, EVBox Liviqo won the Red Dot Award for its outstanding product design.

== See also ==
- Charging stations
- Electric vehicle
- Electric vehicle infrastructure
- EVgo
- ChargePoint
