= Green Charge Networks =

American energy storage company

Green Charge Networks, LLC
- Industry: Energy storage
- Headquarters: Santa Clara, California, United States
- Key people: Vic Shao (CEO); Harjinder Bhade (CTO); Mark Triplett (COO); Tim Larrison (CFO); Stephen Kelley (Senior Vice President of Sales)
- Website: greenchargenet.com

Green Charge Networks LLC is an energy storage company based in Santa Clara, California. Founded in 2009, Green Charge uses predictive software to try to reduce peak demand charges for businesses.

== Projects ==
The first pilot GreenStation reduction system was installed in July 2011 at a 7-Eleven in New York. GreenStation survived Hurricane Sandy. It has saved a 7-Eleven store 56 percent on their utility bills during New York's 2013 summer heat wave.

In March 2014, Green Charge announced that it had signed 1.5 MW of energy storage projects with 7-Eleven, Avis, Walgreens and others.

== Funding ==
Green Charge received $12 million in a grant from the United States Department of Energy in 2011. The company received further funding from angel investor Richard Lowenthal, founder and CTO of car charging network ChargePoint, in December 2013. In March 2014, Green Charge received $10 million in financing from TIP Capital to finance energy storage projects for their customers with zero upfront cost. In July 2014, Green Charge secured $56 million in capital from K Road DG.

In May 2016, Engie acquired an 80 percent stake in Green Charge.
