= Zalău explosion =

Coordinates: 47°11′N 23°3′E

2007 Zalău explosion
- Zalău (Romania) Location of Zalău within Romania
- Date: September 14, 2007
- Time: 7:30 EEST (4:30 UTC)
- Location: Zalău, Sălaj County, Romania
- Deaths: 2
- Injuries: 15

The Zalău explosion occurred on September 14, 2007 in a block of flats in Zalău, Romania as the result of a gas leak. Two people died and fifteen were injured in the explosion. The structure was severely affected and the block of flats E24 was demolished in October 2007. A total of 19 families were affected by the deflagration. They had been petitioning local natural gas distributor E.ON Gaz for two years before the explosion as a strong smell of gas could be sensed both inside and outside the block of flats. The gas network system had been eight years overdue before the explosion.

On September 19, 2007, hundreds of people participated in the funeral of those who died in the explosion. Because E.ON Gaz did not provide support to the affected families, they protested in front of the headquarters of the company in Târgu Mureș on September 14, 2009. In December 2010, six persons were sentenced to prison in connection with the explosion, but in December 2011 their sentences were suspended. Compensations owed to individuals ranged from 67,000 to 222,000 lei. In March 2012, the former owners started to rebuild the block of flats.
