= Distrigas =

Distrigas was a natural gas company based in Belgium. In addition to Belgium, the company operated also in France, the Netherlands and Germany. On 1 November 2012, Distrigas merged with Nuon Belgium and became Eni Gas & Power NV/SA, a wholly owned subsidiary of Eni.

== History ==
Distrigas was founded in 1929 by the Imperial Continental Gas Association. In 2001, Distrigas was unbundled separating gas transmission company Fluxys and reorganizing Distrigas to natural gas trading company. Distrigas went public with majority owned by Suez. As a consequence of the merger of Gaz de France and Suez, according to conditions posed by the European Commission with regards to allowing the merger, on 29 May 2008 Suez sold its stake in Distrigas to Eni for €2.7 billion.
