= Engie Energy International =

British electricity generation company

- Type: Subsidiary (Private limited company)
- Industry: Electricity
- Founded: 2000
- Headquarters: Newcastle upon Tyne, England, United Kingdom
- Key people: Dirk Beeuwsaert (Chairman); Philip Cox (CEO)
- Products: Electrical power
- Revenue: €16.167 billion (2011)
- Operating income: €2.805 billion (2011)
- Net income: €1.797 billion (2011)
- Parent: Engie
- Website: Official website

Engie Energy International, formerly International Power, is a multinational electricity generation company headquartered in Newcastle upon Tyne, and a wholly owned subsidiary of the French company Engie (formerly GDF Suez).

The company was formed as International Power in 2000 by the demerger of National Power. It was listed on the London Stock Exchange from 2000 to 2 July 2012, and was a constituent of the FTSE 100 Index for most of that period. It had a market capitalisation of approximately £16.9 billion as of 23 December 2011, making it the 24th-largest company on the London Stock Exchange.

In February 2011, GDF Suez acquired a 70% interest in International Power. The purchase of the remaining 30% was announced by GDF Suez in April 2012, and the transaction closed in July 2012. Following the acquisition, the company was renamed GDF Suez Energy International. In 2015, GDF Suez rebranded as Engie, and its subsidiary renamed itself in accordance.

== History ==
Logo as International Power

In 2000 National Power demerged its UK businesses as Innogy plc with the remainder of the business being renamed International Power. The Company was first listed on the London Stock Exchange on 2 October 2000.

In August 2010 the company announced a tie-up with GDF Suez via a reverse takeover whereby GDF Suez transferred its Energy International Business Areas (outside Europe) and certain assets in the UK and Turkey to International Power in exchange for 70% of the stock of the combined entity. The remaining 30% remained in the ownership of the existing International Power shareholders. The combination was completed on 3 February 2011 following approval by shareholders.

In October 2010 MeyGen, a consortium of Morgan Stanley, Atlantis Resources Corporation and International Power, received an operational lease from the Crown Estate for a 400 MW tidal power project for 25 years in the Pentland Firth.

On 16 April 2012, GDF Suez announced the purchase of the remaining 30% of International Power and the transaction closed in July 2012.

International Power has a pipeline of large projects in the emerging markets; namely South America, the Middle East, South-East Asia - representing approximately 13 GW generating capacity and expected to be completed between 2014 and 2017. The purchase of IP will boost GDF Suez' presence in the growing energy demand regions.

== Operations ==
The company has more than 66 GW of power generation (gross) in operation and 22 GW gross capacity under construction. It has five business regions, and operates in 27 countries.
