= Fluxys =

European natural gas pipeline company

Fluxys Belgium SA

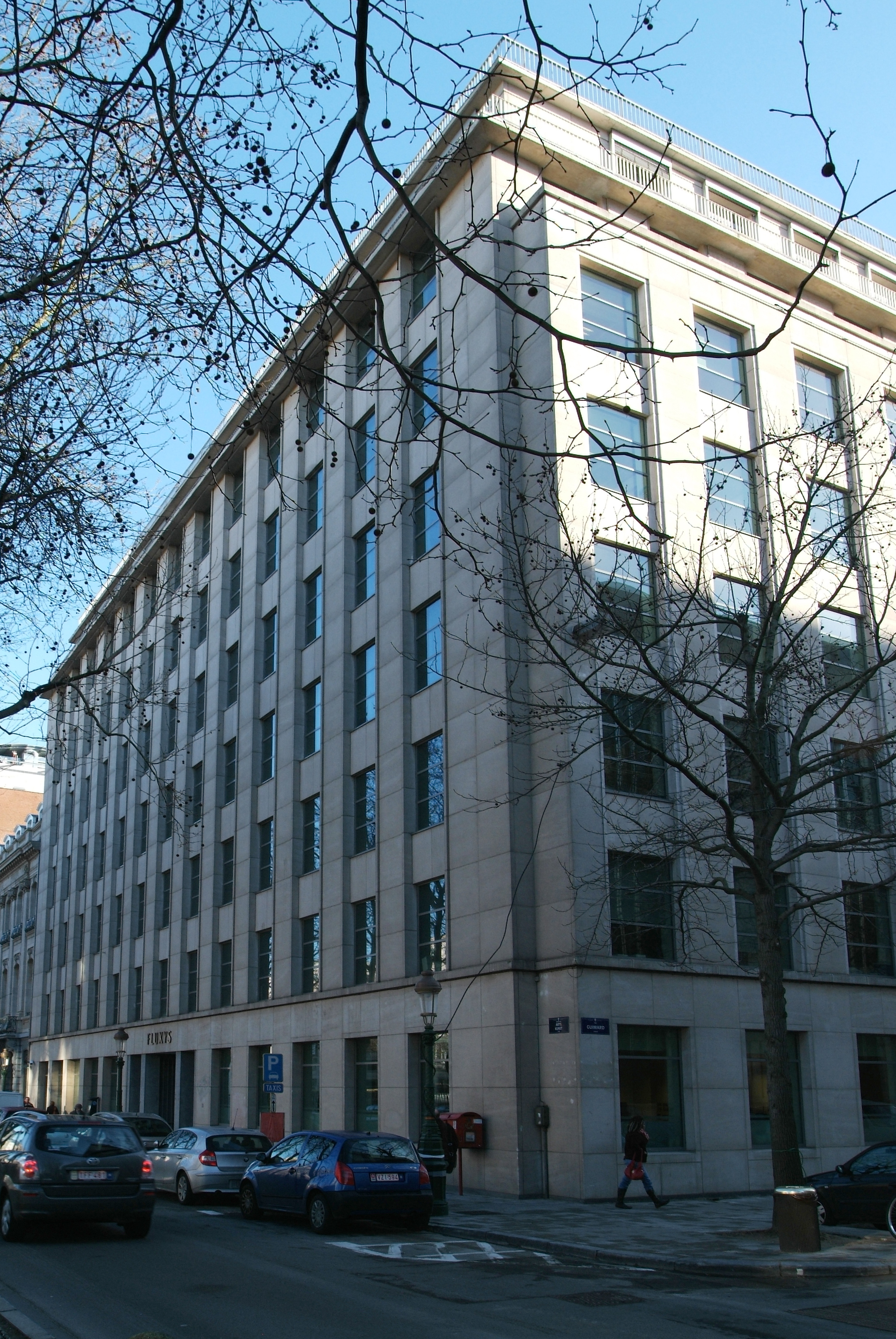
- Fluxys headquarters in Brussels
- Type: Public limited company
- Traded as: Euronext Brussels: FLUX
- ISIN: BE0974265945
- Industry: Oil and gas
- Headquarters: Brussels, Belgium
- Key people: Pascal De Buck (CEO) Andries Gryffroy (chairman)
- Services: Transmission, storage and LNG-terminalling infrastructure
- Operating income: €1 267 million (2024)
- Net income: €337 million (2024)
- Number of employees: 1381 employees (2024)
- Subsidiaries: Dunkerque LNG, Fluxys Belgium, Fluxys Brasil, Fluxys Byte-it, Fluxys Chile, Fluxys c-grid, Fluxys c-grid Antwerpen, Fluxys Deutschland, Fluxys hydrogen, FluxSwiss, Fluxys TENP, GMSL, Interconnector, Nextgrid Holding (non-exhaustive list)
- Website: www.fluxys.com

Fluxys is an oil and gas infrastructure group based in Belgium, active in the transmission, storage, and terminalling of Natural gas, Biomethane, Hydrogen, and CO2.

Since the early 2000s, the Fluxys group has expanded its activities beyond Belgium's borders and is now present in Germany, the Netherlands, The United Kingdom, Greece, Switzerland, France, Albania, Portugal, Brazil, Chile, and Oman.

Through its subsidiaries and holdings in various companies, Fluxys operates 28,000 kilometers of pipelines, LNG terminals with a total annual regasification capacity of 485 TWh, and underground natural gas storage facilities with a total capacity of 1.5 billion m³.

Due to reduced production from the Groningen gas field in the Netherlands, Belgium had to switch from low-calorific gas (L-gas) to high-calorific gas (H-gas). The conversion of all affected customers, which began in 2018, was completed by the end of summer 2024.

In Belgium, Fluxys' counterpart for the electricity grid is Elia Transmission Belgium.

== History ==
In Belgium, the purchase, sale, storage, transmission of natural gas and LNG-terminalling activities were historically handled by Distrigaz, a company founded in 1929. In March 2001, the European Commission published a proposal to accelerate the opening up of the internal gas market. On 16 July 2001, the Belgian Federal Parliament approved several amendments to the Gas Act of 29 April 1999.

On 30 November 2001, the partial demerger of Distrigas led to the creation of Fluxys. At the time, Fluxys' shares were held by Belgian Shell, Tractebel (a subsidiary of Suez), Fluxhold and Publigaz (a holding company owned by Belgian municipalities), while 16.71% of the shares were listed on the Euronext Brussels Regulated Market. The Belgian State held a specific share, known as a "golden share".

Suez held as much as 57.25% of Fluxys shares prior to its 2008 merger with Gaz de France to form GDF Suez (now Engie), but was obligated to reduce its stake to satisfy the concerns of the European Commissioner for Competition. Engie still retained 44.75% of Fluxys as of July 2008.

In 2010, 89.97% of the shares were held by Publigas, while the remainder (10.03%) were traded on the secondary market of Euronext Brussels. That same year, the group's structure was revised to take into account the latest developments in Belgian legislation, following the Third Energy Package of legislative measures regarding the independence of network operators from natural gas suppliers.

In March 2011, the Caisse de dépôt et placement du Québec (CDPQ) acquired a 10% stake in Fluxys G, the parent company of Fluxys, through a €150 million capital increase.

On 8 May 2012, Fluxys changed its name to Fluxys Belgium. Regulated by law, Fluxys Belgium is a natural monopoly; it is solely responsible for managing the Belgian gas infrastructure. The government has appointed the Commission for the regulation of Electricity and Gas as the regulator for setting tariffs. The parent company Fluxys G was renamed Fluxys.

At the end of 2012, Fluxys carried out a capital increase of more than €140 million. The Federal Participation and Investment Company (SFPIM) acquired a stake of approximately 2% in the company.

Since the early 2000s, the Fluxys group has been present in several countries with holdings including:

- In the United Kingdom: Interconnector pipeline in 2004 and GMSL company in 2002
- In the Netherlands: BBL pipeline in 2006
- In France: Dunkerque LNG regasification terminal in 2011
- In Switzerland: FluxSwiss company in 2011
- In Germany: NEL and TENP pipelines in 2011, EUGAL in 2017, and OAL in 2024, OGE company in 2023
- In Albania: TAP pipeline in 2013
- In Greece: DESFA company in 2018 and TAP pipeline in 2013
- In Portugal: Fluxys Byte It ICT service center in 2024.

Since the 2020s, the group has become active with holdings in Brazil (TBG pipeline in 2021), Chile (Quintero LNG regasification terminal in 2022), and Oman (OQGN company in 2023). At the end of 2022, Energy Infrastructure Partners, AG Insurance, Ethias and the Société Fédérale de Participations et d'Investissement have acquired CDPQ's shares in Fluxys.

== Shareholders (as of 31 December 2024) ==
Name	Percentage
Publigas-Publigaz	77.43%
Energy Infrastructure Partners	15.22%
SFPIM	3.44%
AG Insurance	1.97%
Ethias	1.32%
Personnel and management	0.62%

== Projects ==
In mid-2013, Fluxys acquired a 16% stake in the Trans Adriatic Pipeline (TAP), which transports natural gas from Azerbaijan to Europe via Turkey, Greece and Italy. In September 2014, Fluxys increased its stake by 3% to 19% and in January 2023 by 1% to 20% following the acquisition of the AXPO stake. Work began in 2016, and the first gas flowed through the pipeline at the end of 2020. The initial capacity is about 10 billion m³ per year and can be increased to 20 billion in function of market developments.

Fluxys holds a 16.5% stake in the EUGAL (European Gas Pipeline Link) project in Germany. The two gas pipelines transport gas from northern Germany to the border with the Czech Republic. Construction of the first gas pipeline began in August 2018 and the second in mid-2019. The pipeline was commissioned between 2020 and 2021.

Between 2023 and 2025, Fluxys Belgium worked on doubling its pipeline between Zeebrugge and Brussels to increase natural gas transport capacity both to the hinterland and to Germany, while also enabling the transport of hydrogen.

== Role in the energy transition ==
Fluxys develops infrastructure for the transport of hydrogen, CO₂, and biomethane. In 2019, Fluxys partnered with Colruyt Group on a project to install a 25 MW (expandable) electrolyser plant to convert offshore wind power into hydrogen at industrial scale. Fluxys has since withdrawn from the Hyoffwind project. At the end of 2023, Germany decided to build a central hydrogen network (Kernnetz) covering nearly 9,000 km by 2032. The plans were drawn up by FNB Gas, the German association of gas transmission system operators, in which OGE, Fluxys TENP and Fluxys Deutschland play an active role.

On 26 April 2024, Fluxys hydrogen (subsidiary of Fluxys Belgium), is appointed as the operator responsible for developing and operating Belgium's hydrogen transmission network. On 23 October 2024, the first volumes of biomethane produced by Green Logix Biogas in Lommel are injected directly into Fluxys Belgium's natural gas transmission network.

In mid-2025, Fluxys Belgium, Pipelink and Air Liquide join forces within Fluxys c-grid Antwerp, a joint venture that is currently building a network of CO₂ pipelines in the Antwerp port area, with a view to connecting industrial players to permanent underground storage solutions.

Fluxys is involved in CO2 export projects in Belgium (Antwerp@C & Zeebrugge CO2 Highway Europe) and abroad (in the port of Dunkirk – D’Artagnan).

Early 2025, Fluxys established Nextgrid Holding in partnership with Publi-T. Through Nextgrid Holding, the Fluxys group holds a minority stake in the Belgian electricity transmission group Elia.

== Controversy ==
As of 7 April 2014, when ice precludes the LNG shipments from Yamal LNG at Sabetta along the Northern Sea Route, the Fluxys terminal at Zeebrugge will serve Russia as its LNG port for the Asia-Pacific region.

Ukrainian National Agency on Corruption Prevention included Fluxys in the list of International Sponsors of War in November 2023 because the company was promoting the export of Russian LNG using the Fluxys terminal facilities.

== See also ==
- 2004 explosions in Ghislenghien
