= Suez (company, 2015) =

French water treatment & waste management company

Suez S.A.
- Type: Société Anonyme
- ISIN: FR0010613471
- Industry: Utilities
- Predecessor: Gaz de France; Suez
- Founded: 22 July 2008
- Headquarters: Altiplano, 4, place de la Pyramide La Défense, France
- Products: Water management, waste management
- Revenue: €9.5 billion (2025)
- Number of employees: 40,000 (2025)
- Website: Global Website

Suez SA (formerly Suez Environnement) is a French-based utility company which operates largely in the water and waste management sectors. The company has its head office in La Défense, Paris. In 2015, all the group's brands became Suez.

== History ==
Formerly an operating division of Suez, the company was spun out as a stand-alone entity as part of the merger to form GDF Suez (now Engie) on 22 July 2008. Engie remained the largest shareholder of the company with a 35% stake. On the stock market, Suez Environnement's share price increased 40% in value on its first day.

In April 2014, Suez Environnement signed three major water treatment contracts in India worth 61 million euros. In July 2015, the group Suez Environnement simplified its name to become Suez, after the group GDF-Suez changed its name to Engie, leaving the name Suez available again. In September 2015, Suez acquired Sembcorp's 40% stake in the companies' common joint-venture to provide water treatment and waste management in Australia.

On 1 October 2017 Suez bought the Water & Process Technologies unit from GE Power for 3.4 billion dollars and formed a new business unit called Suez Water Technologies & Solutions. Suez shares are listed on the Euronext exchanges in Paris and Brussels.

In 2022, the consulting firm Bioentech, founded in partnership with INRAE, was placed into compulsory liquidation. It was subsequently acquired in its entirety by the Suez Group.

Water Technologies and Solutions “WTS” subsidiary

- WTS was formed as a 70%-30% joint venture between Suez and CDPQ in 2017, before becoming a subsidiary of Veolia following the Veolia–Suez merger in 2022, with CDPQ keeping its 30% minority stake. In FY2024, WTS achieved revenues of €3.3bn ($3.6bn) and EBITDA of €472M ($511M).
- In 2021 this subsidiary was sold to Veolia along with other Suez entities

On 14 May 2019 Bertrand Camus was appointed as chief executive officer of Suez.

On 1 February 2022 Suez was acquired by a consortium of shareholders, and a new CEO, Sabrina Soussan, was appointed.

As of 1 August Sabrina Soussan was appointed chairman and chief executive officer of Suez.

== Partnership ==
For several decades, Suez has collaborated with INRAE (France's National Research Institute for Agriculture, Food, and Environment). Notably, they jointly founded the consulting firm Bioentech in Saint-Malo.

== Financial results ==
Financial results in millions of euros:

	2019	2018	2017	2016	2015	2014	2013	2012	2011	2010	2009	2008
Revenues	18,015	17,331	15,783	15,322	15,135	14,324	14,644	15,102	14,830	13,869	12,296	12,364
EBITDA	3,220	2,768	2,578	2,651	2,751	2,644	2,520	2,450	2,513	2,339	2,060	2,102
Current operating income	1,208	1,142	1,000	1,102	1,115	1,011	1,184	1,146	1,040	1,025	926	1,059
Net income (group share)	352	335	295	420.3	407.6	417.2	352	251	323	565	403	533

== Main key figures ==
Key figures for the group in 2025:

- revenue: €9.5 billion;
- 40,000 employees;
- 40 countries;
- 67 million people worldwide benefit from drinking water
- 36 million people worldwide benefit from sanitation
- 8,7 TWh of energy produced from waste and wastewater
- 1,300 experts and more than 1,800 patents
- 10 technical and innovation centers and R&D centers in Europe and Asia

== Company governance ==
The Group's executive committee is made up of:

- Xavier Girre: CEO
- François Blanckaert, EVP Procurement
- Arnaud Bazire, EVP Water activities in France
- Laurent Carrot, EVP Recycling & Recovery in France
- Stéphanie Cau, EVP Communications & Chairwoman of SUEZ Foundation
- Jean-Pierre Fouilloux, EVP Engineering & Construction entity
- Laurent-Guillaume Guerra, EVP Human Resources, Health & Safety, Real Estate
- Anne-Sophie Le Lay, EVP Chief Legal Officer
- Bénédicte Liénard, EVP Transformation, IT
- Pierre Pauliac, EVP International
- Nathalie Pivet, EVP Finance, Sustainable Development, EIR
- John Scanlon, EVP, SUEZ in the UK

== Shareholder structure ==
In April 2025, the shareholder structure was as follows:

Shareholder structure
Meridiam	38.3%
GIP	38.3%
Caisse des Dépôts et Consignation / CNP Assurances	18.8%
Employees	4.4%
