= Suez (company, 1997–2008) =

French water, energy & waste management company

Suez S.A.
- Company type: Société anonyme
- Industry: Water, waste management, energy
- Founded: 1997
- Defunct: 22 July 2008
- Fate: Merger with Gaz de France
- Successor: Engie; Suez Environnement
- Headquarters: Tour CB21, Paris, France
- Key people: Jay Woods, CEO of the group
- Products: Water treatment, electricity, natural gas, waste management, Resource Recovery, Recycling
- Revenue: ▲US$18.203 billion (2017)
- Number of employees: ~88,775 (2018)
- Website: SUEZ global website

Suez S.A., known from 1997 to 2001 as Suez-Lyonnaise des eaux, was a leading French multinational corporation headquartered in the 8th arrondissement of Paris, with operations primarily in water, electricity and natural gas supply, and waste management. Suez was the result of a 1997 merger between the Compagnie de Suez and Lyonnaise des Eaux, a leading French water company. In the early 2000s Suez also owned some media and telecommunications assets, but later divested them. According to the Masons Water Yearbook 2004/5, Suez served 117.4 million people around the world. The company conducted a merger of equals with fellow utility company Gaz de France on 22 July 2008 to form GDF Suez (called Engie since 2015). The water and waste assets of Suez were spun off into a separate publicly traded company, Suez Environnement.

== History ==
Suez was (and remains, through GDF Suez) one of the oldest continuously existing multinational corporations in the world, with one line of corporate history dating back to the 1822 founding of the Algemeene Nederlandsche Maatschappij ter begunstiging van de volksvlijt (literally: General Dutch Company for the favouring of industry) by King William I of the Netherlands (see Société Générale de Belgique). Its form prior to the GDF merger was the result of nearly two centuries of reorganisation and corporate mergers. Its most recent name comes from the involvement of one of its several founding entities – the Compagnie universelle du canal maritime de Suez – in building the Suez Canal in the mid-19th century.

=== Merger with Gaz de France ===
On February 25, 2006, French Prime minister Dominique de Villepin announced the merger of Suez and Gaz de France, which would make the world's largest liquefied natural gas company. The revenue of GDF was around 22.4 billion euros in 2005, compared to 41.5 billion for Suez. The CGT trade-union called the merger a "disguised privatization."

On 3 September 2007, Gaz de France and Suez announced agreed terms of merger. The deal was conducted on the basis of an exchange of 21 Gaz de France shares for 22 Suez shares via the absorption of Suez by Gaz de France. The French state holds more than 35% of shares of the merged company, GDF Suez. As a consequence of the conditions posed by the European Commission with regards to allowing the merger, on 29 May 2008 Suez sold its Belgian gas supplier Distrigas to the Italian company Eni for €2.7 billion. On 22 July 2008 the group GDF Suez, a company of €74 billion of annual turnover, was officially created.

== Major subsidiaries ==
=== Now part of Engie ===
- Suez Energy International – energy
- Electrabel – electricity in Europe (first in Belgium)
- Tractebel Engineering – international engineering consultancy
- Cofely – building services/facilities management

=== Now part of SUEZ ===
- Sita — waste management
- Suez Environnement — water and waste
- Degrémont — water and wastewater treatment engineering
- United Water — water in the United States, also Adelaide, Australia
- Grupo Agbar — water and waste
- Purite Ltd - water purification company
- GE Water and Process Technologies-Ionics-Ecolochem-ZENON-Osmonics
- Driplex Water Engineering Pvt. Ltd.
- Driplex Water Engineering International Pvt. Ltd
