= Engie =

French multinational utility company

Engie SA

- Engie headquarters in La Défense, Courbevoie, France
- Type: Société Anonyme
- Traded as: Euronext Paris: ENGI; CAC 40 component
- ISIN: FR0010208488
- Industry: Electric utility
- Predecessor: Gaz de France; Suez
- Founded: 22 July 2008; 18 years ago
- Headquarters: La Défense, Courbevoie, France
- Key people: Catherine MacGregor (CEO); Jean-Pierre Clamadieu (chairman)
- Products: Natural gas production, sale and distribution, electricity generation and distribution, hydroelectricity, nuclear power, wind power, energy trading, Facilities Management and Business Services
- Revenue: ▼€82.56 billion (2023)
- Operating income: ▲€9.5 billion (2023)
- Net income: ▲€2.21 billions (2023)
- Total assets: ▼€194.64 billion (2023)
- Total equity: ▼€35.72 billion (2023)
- Owner: French state (23.64%); Employees of the company (3.27%); BlackRock (4.49%); Caisse des dépôts et consignations and CNP Assurances (4.59%); Public (without BlackRock), institutional investor, individuals shareholders & others (63.25%); Treasury stock (0.76%)
- Number of employees: 96,454 (2022)
- Subsidiaries: GRDF; GRTgaz; Elengy; Storengy; Altiservice Engie; Endel Engie; Engie Ecova; Engie Electrabel; Engie Fabricom; Engie Global Markets; Engie Home Services; Engie IT (Information et Technologies); SHEM; Engie Lab Crigen; Engie Laborelec; Engie M2M; Engie Solairedirect; Engie Impact; Tractebel; Culturespaces; Engie Green; La Compagnie du vent Électricité de Tahiti Smart4Power
- Website: engie.com/en

Engie SA (stylised in all caps as ENGIE) is a French multinational electric utility company, headquartered in La Défense, Courbevoie. Its activities cover electricity generation and distribution, natural gas, nuclear power, renewable energy, district energy, and the petroleum industry. It is involved in both upstream (engineering, sale, operation, maintenance) and downstream (waste management, dismantling) activities.

Engie supplies electricity to 27 countries in Europe and 48 countries worldwide. The company, formed on 22 July 2008, by the merger of Gaz de France and Suez, traces its origins to the Universal Suez Canal Company founded in 1858 to construct the Suez Canal. As of 2022, Engie employed 96,454 people worldwide with revenues of €93.86 billion.

Engie is listed on the Euronext exchanges in Paris and Brussels and is a constituent of the CAC 40 index. The company was headed from 2016 to 2020 by Isabelle Kocher, who significantly transformed it, notably by deciding to exit coal activities and by investing in renewable energy and energy transition services. Despite the company's commitment to diversification, the majority of its primary activities still revolve around fossil fuels.

== History ==
=== Background (before 2006) ===
Prior to the GDF Suez merger plans in 2006, the company existed as two separate French multinational corporations – Suez S.A. and Gaz de France.

Suez was (and still remains, through GDF Suez) one of the oldest continuously existing multinational corporations in the world as the result of nearly two centuries of reorganisation and corporate mergers. Its corporate history dates back to the 1822 founded Algemeene Nederlandsche Maatschappij ter begunstiging van de volksvlijt (literally: General Dutch Company for the favouring of industry) by King William I of the Netherlands (see Société Générale de Belgique). The origin of its name 'Suez' traces back to its other founding entity – the Compagnie universelle du canal maritime de Suez founded in 1858 to build the Suez Canal. Suez S.A. was the result of a 1997 merger between the Compagnie de Suez and Lyonnaise des Eaux.

Gaz de France was created in 1946 along with its sister company Électricité de France (EDF) by the French Government. After the liberalisation of Europe's energy markets, Gaz de France also entered into the electricity sector, having developed combined natural gas-electricity offerings. The company's capital was partially floated on the Paris Stock Exchange in July 2005, raising €2.5 billion for the French Government.

=== Evolution of GDF Suez (2006–2008) ===
On 25 February 2006, French Prime minister Dominique de Villepin announced the merger of water supply and treatment, waste management and energy company Suez and power firm Gaz de France, with the aim of creating the world's largest liquefied natural gas company. Since the French state owned over 80% of Gaz de France, it was necessary to pass a new law in order to make the merger possible. Whilst Nicolas Sarkozy was for several months opposed to the Villepin government's plans for a merger of the two companies, preferring a three-way deal with Italy's Enel which would maintain a controlling stake for the state, he subsequently accepted the government proposal.

The plan for a merger between Gaz de France and Suez came under fire from the whole of the political left, which feared the loss of one of the last ways of preventing the price rises experienced over the previous three years, and by the social Gaullists and trade unions. In August 2006, the left-wing opposition submitted a record-breaking 137,449 amendments to the proposed legislation. Under normal procedure, parliament would have been required to vote on the amendments, which would have taken 10 years. The French Constitution does give the government options to bypass such a filibuster, but in the end these were not used.

Law No. 2006-1537 of December 7, 2006, on the energy sector authorised the privatisation of Gaz de France. On September 3, 2007, Gaz de France and Suez announced agreed terms of merger, on the basis of an exchange of 21 Gaz de France shares for 22 Suez shares via the absorption of Suez by Gaz de France. Various holdings of Gaz de France and Suez had to be divested in order to satisfy the concerns of the European Commissioner for Competition: GDF agreed to sell its approximate 25% stake in Belgian electricity producer SPE for €515 million. The stake was purchased by fellow SPE shareholder Centrica which exercised its right of first refusal, blocking a previous agreement to sell the stake to Électricité de France. Suez, meanwhile, was forced to reduce its shareholding in natural gas distributor Fluxys and sell its Belgian gas supply subsidiary Distrigas to Eni.

=== GDF Suez (2008–2015) ===
The newly created GDF Suez came into existence on July 22, 2008; the world's second-largest utility with over €74 billion in annual revenues. The deal resulted in the conversion of the French state's 80% stake in GDF into just over 35% of shares of the new company. The water and waste assets which formerly formed part of Suez were spun off into a new publicly traded company, Suez Environment, in which GDF Suez retains a stake.

In 1975, Ruhrgas and Gaz de France concluded a deal according to which they agreed not to sell gas in each other's home market. The deal was abandoned in 2005.

In July 2009, the European Commission fined GDF Suez and E.ON €553 million both over arrangements on the MEGAL pipeline. It was the second biggest fines imposed by the European Commission and the first one on the energy sector.

In October 2009, GDF Suez placed 6th in an A.T. Kearney/BusinessWeek ranking of the "World's Best Companies", the highest-placed European firm.

On August 10, 2010, the company announced a merger of its GDF SUEZ Energy International business unit, along with its operations within the United Kingdom and Turkey, with International Power. The acquisition created the world's biggest independent power producer, and the enlarged company retained International Power's listing on the London Stock Exchange and was 70% owned by GDF Suez.

In December 2010, GDF SUEZ became the key founding member of the 'Medgrid' company – a consortium of twenty plus utilities, grid operators, equipment makers, financing institutions and investors; which will implement the Medgrid project, a French renewable energy initiative within the framework of the Union for the Mediterranean (UfM). The project, planned in North Africa, aims to promote and develop a Euro-Mediterranean electricity network of 20GW installed generating capacity, with 5GW being devoted for exports to Europe. The Medgrid together with the German initiated Desertec project would serve as the backbone of the European Supergrid.

On April 16, 2012, the purchase of the remaining 30% of International Power was announced by GDF Suez, and the transaction completed in July 2012. GDF Suez was advised by Rothschild and Ondra Partners, while Barclays, Morgan Stanley and Nomura advised International Power.

On August 9, 2013, GDF Suez, through its Energy Services business line, announced the purchase of Balfour Beatty's UK Facilities Management business – Balfour Beatty WorkPlace. The legacy Cofely business incorporated the legacy Balfour Beatty Workplace Business which went on to acquire Lend Lease FM in 2014 from Lendlease giving the new business a substantial platform in the operation of PFI assets in the UK.

=== GDF Suez becomes Engie: 2015 – present ===
On April 24, 2015 GDF Suez announced it was changing its name to "eNGie", in an effort to further expand the company's international footprint. CEO and chairman Gérard Mestrallet said the new name was a symbol to meet the challenges of the energy transition and accelerate the group's development. The subsidiary International Power became Engie Energy International.

In July 2015, Engie acquired 95% of Solairedirect, raising its photovoltaic production from 125 to 486 MW.

On March 2, 2017, Engie acquired Keepmoat Regeneration for £330m to form the places and communities division, headed up by Keepmoat LTD's former CEO Dave Sheridan. The new division is focused on three key activities; energy, services and regeneration.

GDF Suez has been ranked as among the 13th best of 92 oil, gas, and mining companies on indigenous rights and resource extraction in the Arctic.

In April 2019, Engie announced the acquisition of 90% of Transportadora Associada de Gás (TAG), Brazil's largest natural gas transmission system owner (2,800 miles of pipeline, 47% of the country's gas infrastructure), for €7.7 billion.

It is the largest acquisition since International Power in 2010. The operation allows Engie to develop on its strategic axis of energy infrastructure as well as in Brazil, one of the priority countries.

In February 2020, the board of directors announces that it will not propose the reappointment of Isabelle Kocher at the next shareholders' meeting, which will bring to an end of her chief executive officer position.

In 2021, Engie was ranked fiftieth in the Arctic Environmental Responsibility Index (AERI) that covers 120 oil, gas, and mining companies involved in resource extraction north of the Arctic Circle.

In July 2021, the company re-organised its structure to create four businesses: Renewables, Energy Solutions, Networks and Thermal & Supply, together with a new entity, Equans, which would bring together its technical services (including electrical, heating, ventilation & air conditioning, cooling, mechanical & electrical, digital & IT and facilities management) under one entity.

In November 2021, Engie sold its technical services business, Equans, to Bouygues in a transaction worth €7.1bn.

In August 2023, it was announced Engie had acquired the Houston-based battery storage company, Broad Reach Power.

== Controversies ==
Engie's relationship with Russian energy giant Gazprom has faced scrutiny, particularly in light of the 2022 Russian invasion of Ukraine and subsequent European sanctions. In 2021, long-term contracts with Gazprom represented approximately 20% of Engie's global gas sales and consumption, raising concerns about the company's reliance on Russian energy. Following disruptions in gas supply, Engie initiated arbitration proceedings against Gazprom Export LLC in late 2022, citing Gazprom's failure to meet contractual obligations and seeking penalties and damages.

== Strategy ==
=== Transformation of the company's business ===
Since 2014, Engie has operated a strategic shift, by reducing future exploration in fossil fuels and investing massively in renewable energies (solar, wind, geothermal, biomass, hydroelectric, and nuclear) and energy efficiency services.

In 2015, Engie announced its decision to stop new investments in coal plants and to dispose of €15 billion in assets in order to reinvest into projects that promote low-carbon, distributed-energy. Engie also announced it will invest €22bn in renewable energies, energy services such as heating and cooling networks, and decentralized energy technology.

In 2016, Isabelle Kocher defined the strategy of Engie as follows: to promote decarbonized energy (oil and coal replaced by renewables and natural gas that emit less greenhouse gases), decentralized energy (energy produced and stored as close as possible to its place of consumption), and digitized energy (big data and digital tools for energy efficiency and network management). The group created Engie Digital and planned to invest €1.5 billion on digital and new technologies related to energy.

Engie also started promoting an open innovation approach with a dedicated entity named "Engie Fab" focused on the development of intelligent networks (smart grids), Internet of objects, green mobility, energy storage, and hydrogen.

Between 2016 and 2018, Engie invested €15 billion in new activities, financed by the sale of coal and upstream oil and gas.

=== 2019–2021 strategic plan ===
In 2019, Isabelle Kocher announces the strategic plan of the company for the 2019–2021 period, with an ambition to become the world leader in the zero-carbon transition. The strategic shift includes accelerating its investments in renewable energies.

Isabelle Kocher announces the definitive exit of coal activities. Engie plans to invest another €12 billion in renewable activities, partly financed by the sale of €6 billion assets (including the last coal plants).

The 12 billion break down as follows: 3 to 3.3 billion into gas infrastructure; 4 to 5 billion into client services and solutions; and 2.3 to 2.8 billion into renewable energies, adding a 9 GWh production capacity, to reach a renewable installed capacity of 52 to 64 GW by 2026.

As far as the services are concerned, Isabelle Kocher's plan is to develop "energy transition as a service" for large companies and metropolises, who she says are driving the "second wave of energy transition" by searching ways to reduce their carbon emissions (the first wave having been driven by the states). She also says it might be "the invention of a new industry" of a 1 billion dollar potential value.

Engie also announces its intention to leave 20 of the 70 countries where it is active, and focus its activities on 20 countries and 30 metropolitan areas, mainly in Southeast Asia and Africa.

== Operations ==
=== Power generation ===
==== France ====
Thanks to former Suez subsidiaries such as Compagnie Nationale du Rhône (CNR), Electrabel and Société hydroélectrique du Midi (SHEM), GDF Suez is the second-largest generator of electricity in France behind EDF. The company indicated in December 2011 that 3/4 of the group's production comes from sources that emit no CO_{2} principally hydroelectricity (through CNR and SHEM) and wind power, the latter of which both Gaz de France and Suez moved aggressively into in 2007 and 2008. Recently acquired subsidiaries include Compagnie du vent (majority stake), the wind farm business of Nass & Wind and Erelia. The company also operates a natural gas-fired combined cycle power plant (DK6) in Dunkirk. With the stated aim of reaching a total production capacity of 10 GW by 2013, three gas-fired thermal power plants at Fos-sur-Mer, Montoir-de-Bretagne and Saint-Brieuc are currently in various stages of development, as is a solar panel project in Curbans.

==== International ====
Engie also generates electricity in a number of countries outside France. Most notably, the company is the leading producer in both Belgium and the Netherlands through Electrabel (and the fifth-largest generator in Europe overall), as well as the largest non-state owned generator in both Brazil and Thailand (thanks to majority stakes in Engie Brasil and Glow Energy respectively).

The company also operates in North and Latin America through its Suez Energy International unit, as well as in other European and Asian countries. The company generates electricity through various types of plants, including thermal power, nuclear power, combined heat and power, wind farms, hydroelectric and biomass. Engie is currently developing a $15.8 billion nuclear power plant in Sinop, Turkey in partnership with Itochu and Mitsubishi Heavy Industries.

Since 2012, Engie is also an Australian energy retailer, initially operating as Simply Energy and later Engie Australia.

In November 2016, Engie signed an agreement with Moroccan energy company Nareva. The two companies are planning to develop energy assets in North and Western Africa that will produce 5,000 and 6,000 megawatts. The plans will take place between 2020 and 2025.

In December 2016, Engie announced that Azzour North One Independent Water & Power Project (IWPP) has started full commercial operations. The power and water plant is Kuwait's most efficient source of electricity.

In January 2017, Engie was awarded the contract and achieved financial closing for the greenfield Fadhili independent power project (IPP) in Saudi Arabia, the most efficient cogeneration plant in the country.

==== Coal-fired power plants ====
In October 2015, Engie announced that it will no longer build coal-fired power plants. Gérard Mestrallet said projects for which Engie had already entered into firm commitments would be honored, but projects, where contracts had not yet been signed, will de facto be suspended. As a result, Engie abandoned two coal-fired power plants projects in Ada Yumurtalik (Turkey) and in Thabametsi (South Africa). In February 2016, Engie announced the selling of its stakes in the Paiton power plant located in Indonesia and in the Meenakshi power plant located in India. Engie also announced the closing of the Rugeley power station in England.

In May 2016 Engie CEO Isabelle Kocher told a French Senate committee that it was planning a gradual withdrawal from coal-fired generation over the coming years. This could include closure of, or sale of its stake in, the lignite-fired Hazelwood Power Station in Victoria, Australia. Hazelwood power plant closed at the end of March 2017.

Engie sold to Enea its Polaniec power plant, in Poland.

In February 2019, Engie announced the definitive exit of all coal activities.

=== Renewable energy ===
Engie's renewable installed capacity represented 19.5% of its energy mix at the end of 2016. The Group's renewable energy mix is composed of hydropower, solar energy, onshore and offshore wind power, biomass, and geothermal sources.

Engie has won bids for several solar and wind projects since 2016: a 338 MW solar project in India (April 2017), 209 MW in contracts for solar and wind projects in Mexico, and a 40 MW solar project in Peru. It has begun construction of the 100 MW Kathu solar park in South Africa.

Engie invested in Heliatek, a German company pioneering technologies in organic photovoltaics, in September 2016. The Group also assumed 100% control of La Compagnie du Vent in March 2017, and a 30% stake in Unisun, a Chinese solar photovoltaics company, in April 2017.

In Brazil, Engie's largest international hydroelectric project, and the fourth largest power plant in the country (3,750 MW) was inaugurated in December 2016.

Engie built its first international geothermal power generation plant in Indonesia. In October 2016, Engie developed France's first marine geothermal power station in Marseilles. In May 2017, Mexico's ministry of energy awarded Engie three geothermal exploration permits.

In February 2019, Engie announced plans to add 9 gigawatts (GW) of renewable energy generation capacity to its portfolio by 2021, as part of its plan to accelerate the investments in renewable and low carbon energies.

In May 2019, Engie and Portuguese power company EDP announced the future creation of a 50-50 joint venture in offshore wind, starting with a total of 1.5 gigawatts (GW) under construction and 4 GW under development.

Engie's Willogoleche Wind Farm (119 MW) opened in South Australia on 30 July 2019. It also owns Pelican Point (500 MW) and Dry Creek (156 MW) gas-fired power stations and Canunda Wind Farm (46 MW) in South Australia.

Belgium and Engie agreed to extend the use of the country's nuclear reactors by 10 years after Russia's invasion of Ukraine prompted Belgium's governing coalition to rethink plans to rely more on natural gas in June 2023.

=== Renewable gas ===
Engie covers the whole biomethane chain, from project development with farmers to distribution to the final clients. The group has announced that, by 2030, it would have invested 2 billion euros in renewable gas, 10% of which will be injected into the networks, and that it will produce 5 TWH a year of biomethane.

=== Natural gas ===
In its historic activity of gas, Engie covers the whole gas chain, from exploration and production to distribution. It is the:

- second-largest gas transportation network in Europe
- largest gas distribution network in Europe
- fifth largest LNG portfolio in the world
- largest LNG importer in Europe
- second-largest LNG terminal operator in Europe.

In November 2016, Engie and Statoil reached an agreement on the renegotiation of their long-term gas supply contracts to adapt them to the evolution of European natural gas markets and to better reflect current market rates.

In 2016, Engie negotiated new contracts for gas supply around the world: an agreement with UkrTransGaz, Ukrainian transmission system operator, on gas transmission and storage; an agreement with AES Andres to foster growth in LNG and natural gas sales in the Caribbean. Engie also committed the Neptune, one of the two FSRU (floating storage and regasification units) of its fleet, to deliver LNG to the first floating LNG import terminal in Turkey.

In China, after an LNG supply agreement with Beijing Gas, Engie is looking at opportunities in the underground gas storage to hold stocks to meet seasonal demand. The bunkering vessel Engie Zeebrugge performed for the first time in the port of Zeebrugge, Belgium, in June 2017. It was the first to provide ship-to-ship supplies for LNG as fuel.

In March 2017, Engie sold its licenses for shale gas exploration in the UK to petrochemicals firm Ineos, as part of its decarbonized strategy In May 2017, Engie enters into exclusive negotiations with Neptune Energy for the sale of its 70% interest in Exploration & Production International ("EPI").

In 2016, Engie signed a technical and commercial cooperation contract with Göteborg Energi to push further the industrialization of the dry biomass-to-gas production approach. Engie is also involved in the Ambigo project, the first dry biomass-to-gas project which will be located in Alkmaar, Netherlands. As a co-investor in the canceled Nord Stream 2 project, Engie wrote off €987 million in April 2022.

=== Energy services ===
Engie provides energy efficiency and environmental services. 90,000 of the group's employees are dedicated to these services.

- Engineering: consulting, feasibility studies, engineering, project management and client support
- Systems, installations and maintenance: electrical installations, industrial maintenance, air conditioning and refrigeration, and systems integration
- Energetic services: energy efficiency, multi-technology maintenance management, cogeneration and facilities management
- Housing services: cost-effective energy, energy performance improvements, renewable energy and thermal renovation
- "Smart city": urban heating and cooling community systems, development of high-end technology, a streamlined energy mix, carbon footprint reduction of buildings
- Micro grids and decentralized energy: local energy production and consumption systems, energy supply in isolated areas, residential self-consumption or in industrial and commercial sectors, eco-district
- Green mobility: alternative fuels (NGV, bioNGV, hydrogen, etc.), charging stations for electric vehicles, transport infrastructures, smart transit systems and upstream design and planning

In March 2017, Engie acquired the Dutch EVBox, one of the suppliers in electric vehicle charging.

Engie (50%) and Axium Infrastructure US (50%) won a 50-year concession to ensure the sustainable energy management of the Ohio State University in Columbus, Ohio, one of the largest university campuses in the United States with 485 buildings.

=== Student accommodation ===
In 2019, Engie won a contract from the University of Leicester to oversee the development of 1,164 new student homes and the refurbishment of a grade II listed building to be used as office and study space, and the construction of a multi-storey car park and the creation of a new teaching and learning centre.

== Shareholder structure ==
As of 31 December 2018

1. State of France (23.64%)
2. BlackRock (5.02%)
3. Caisse des dépôts et consignations (1.83%)
4. CNP Assurances (0.99%)
5. employees of the company (3.97%)
6. free float (63.57%)
7. treasury stock (0.98%)

== Organisation ==
=== Business units ===
In April 2019, as part of its strategic project to develop zero-carbon transition "as a service", Engie announced the organization of its businesses around four business lines: Thermal, Infrastructures, Customer Solutions and Renewables. Engie also announces the creation of Engie Impact, a business entity in charge of strategy for the largest clients.

Engie is also organised in geographic and transverse business units:

- 11 are geographic: Africa, Latin America, Northern America, Asia Pacific, Benelux, Brazil, China, Northern, Southern and Eastern Europe, "Génération Europe" (Belgium, France, Germany, Italy, Luxembourg, Netherlands, Poland, Portugal, Spain, United Kingdom), Middle East, Southern, Central Asia, and Turkey, United Kingdom.
- 8 are set up in France: "France BtoB", "France BtoC", "France Renewable Energy", "France Networks", "Natural Gas Transport" (GRTgaz), "Natural Gas Distribution" (GRDF), Liquefied Natural Gas (LNG) terminals (Elengy), Natural Gas Storage (Storengy).
- 5 are global: "Exploration and Production International", Global LNG (Liquefied Natural Gas), Global Energy Management & Sales (GEMS), Tractebel Engineering, GTT (GazTransport & Technigaz).

=== Subsidiaries and holdings ===
- Altiservice Engie
- Engie Australia
- Engie Axima
- Engie Cofely
- Engie Ineo
- ENGIE IR Holdings LLC
- Engie Impact
- Engie Electrabel
- Engie Endel
- Engie Fabricom
- Engie Global Markets
- Engie Home Services
- Engie IT (Engie Information & Technologies)
- Engie Lab
- Engie MtoM
- Engie Réseaux
- ENGIE Solutions
- Solairedirect
- Tractebel Engie
- Engie Energy International
- Engie EPS
- ENGIE Mobisol

=== Engie main subsidiaries ===
==== GrDF ====
GrDF is the distribution subsidiary of gas, major gas distributor in France and Europe. GRDF builds, operates, and maintains the distribution network. It transports natural gas to customers. It has around 12000 employees and the actual CEO (2017) is senior executive Edouard Sauvage.

==== Engie Cofely ====
Engie Cofely is a subsidiary of energy efficiency and environmental services. It employs 12000 collaborators and generates a turnover of €2,5 billion. The CEO is Jean-Pierre Monéger.

==== Engie IT ====
Engie IT or Engie Information & Technologies is the IT subsidiary of Engie group, founded in 2012 by CEO Jean-Michel Carboni (2012–15). Originally Engie's IT departments were managed by the DSI (€1.35bn of revenue in 2012); Carboni pooled IT departments to create a single subsidiary named Engie IT (Information & Technologies). In 2013 the turnover is around 600 million of EUR.

== Key figures ==
Revenues: €60.1 billion (2019)

Revenue in each region:

- North America: €4.5 bn
- Latin America: €5.3 bn
- Europe: €47.3 bn
- Middle East: €1 bn
- Africa: €0.2bn
- Asia and Oceania: €1.7 bn

Revenue by activity:

- Client Solutions: €21 bn
- Renewable Energy: €2.7 bn
- Networks: €6.6 bn
- Thermal: €4.0 bn
- Other activities: €25.8 bn

Capacity of installed power production: 104,3 GW in 2018, of which:

- Natural gas: 55%
- Renewables: 27%
- Coal: 7%
- Nuclear: 6%
- Other: 5%

Produced electricity: 420 TWh in 2018

Employees: 171,100

Employees in each region:

- North America: 6,300
- Latin America: 14,300
- Europe: 137,200
- Middle East 3,100
- Africa: 3,500
- Asia and Oceania: 6,700

Employees by activity:

- Client Solutions: 119,350
- Renewable Energy: 4,600
- Networks: 22,500
- Thermal: 5,200
- Other activities: 19,450

== Governance ==
The Engie general management:

- Claire Waysand, executive vice president and group's general secretary, assuming the position of interim chief executive officer until the nomination of a new CEO
- Catherine MacGregor, newly appointed company CEO, starting January 2021
- Bankole Cardoso, chairman

The members of the group executive committee are:

- Claire Waysand, executive vice president and general secretary of the group, and interim CEO after Isabelle Kocher leaves the company.
- François Graux, group deputy general secretary and group general counsel. He reports to Claire Waysand, general secretary and interim chief executive officer of Engie.
- Paulo Almirante, executive vice president, and chief operating officer. He is also supervising Brazil, NECST (North, South and Eastern Europe business units), and MESCAT (Middle East, South, and Central Asia and Turkey) Business Units. Until the nomination of a new CEO, he is temporarily entrusted in a collegial manner with Judith Hartmann and Claire Waysand.
- Judith Hartmann, executive vice president, chief financial officer. She is responsible for steering publicly listed subsidiaries: supervision of GTT and coordination with Suez. She is also in charge of corporate social responsibility (CSR).
- Gwenaëlle Huet, executive vice president, in charge of the renewable and hydrogen business units France, responsible for the global renewable business line and general manager of the North America business unit.
- Olivier Biancarelli, executive vice president, chief executive officer of Tractebel, responsible for global business line customer solutions and supervision of Engie Impact.
- Franck Bruel, executive vice president, supervising UK, LATAM (Latin America) and NORAM (US, Canada) business units.
- Ana Busto, executive vice president, brand & communication.
- Pierre Chareyre, executive vice president, supervising GEM (global energy management), Generation Europe, B2C France, and Benelux business units. He is responsible for the thermal global business line.
- Pierre Deheunynck, executive vice president, in charge of group human resources, transformation, corporate, global business support, global care, and real estate.
- Didier Holleaux, executive vice president, supervising Elengy, GRDF, GRTgaz, Storengy, China, and APAC (Asia Pacific) business units. He is also supervising the gas & power networks global business line.
- Shankar Krishnamoorthy, executive vice president in charge of strategy & innovation, industrial development, research & technology, and procurement. He is also supervising the Africa business unit.
- Yves Le Gélard, executive vice president, chief digital officer, in charge of group information systems.
- Wilfrid Petrie, executive vice president, CEO France B2B and supervising France Réseaux business unit.

Engie is administered by a board of directors of 13 members:

- 6 appointed by the shareholders' General Assembly: Bankole Cardoso, Fabrice Brégier, Françoise Malrieu, Ross McInnes, Marie-José Nadeau and Lord Ricketts of Shortlands
- 1 representing the French State, appointed by ministerial order: Isabelle Bui
- 2 appointed by the shareholders assembly upon proposal of the French State: Patrice Durand and Mari-Noëlle Jégo-Laveissière
- 3 representing the employees: Christophe Agogué, Alain Beullier, and Philippe Lepage
- 1 representing the employee shareholders: Christophe Aubert

The board is backed by the recommendations of four specialized committees (audit; appointments and compensations; ethics, environment and sustainable development; strategy, investment, and technology).

== See also ==
- European Distributed Energy Partnership
- Green Charge Networks
