= Mittelbrunn =

- Municipality
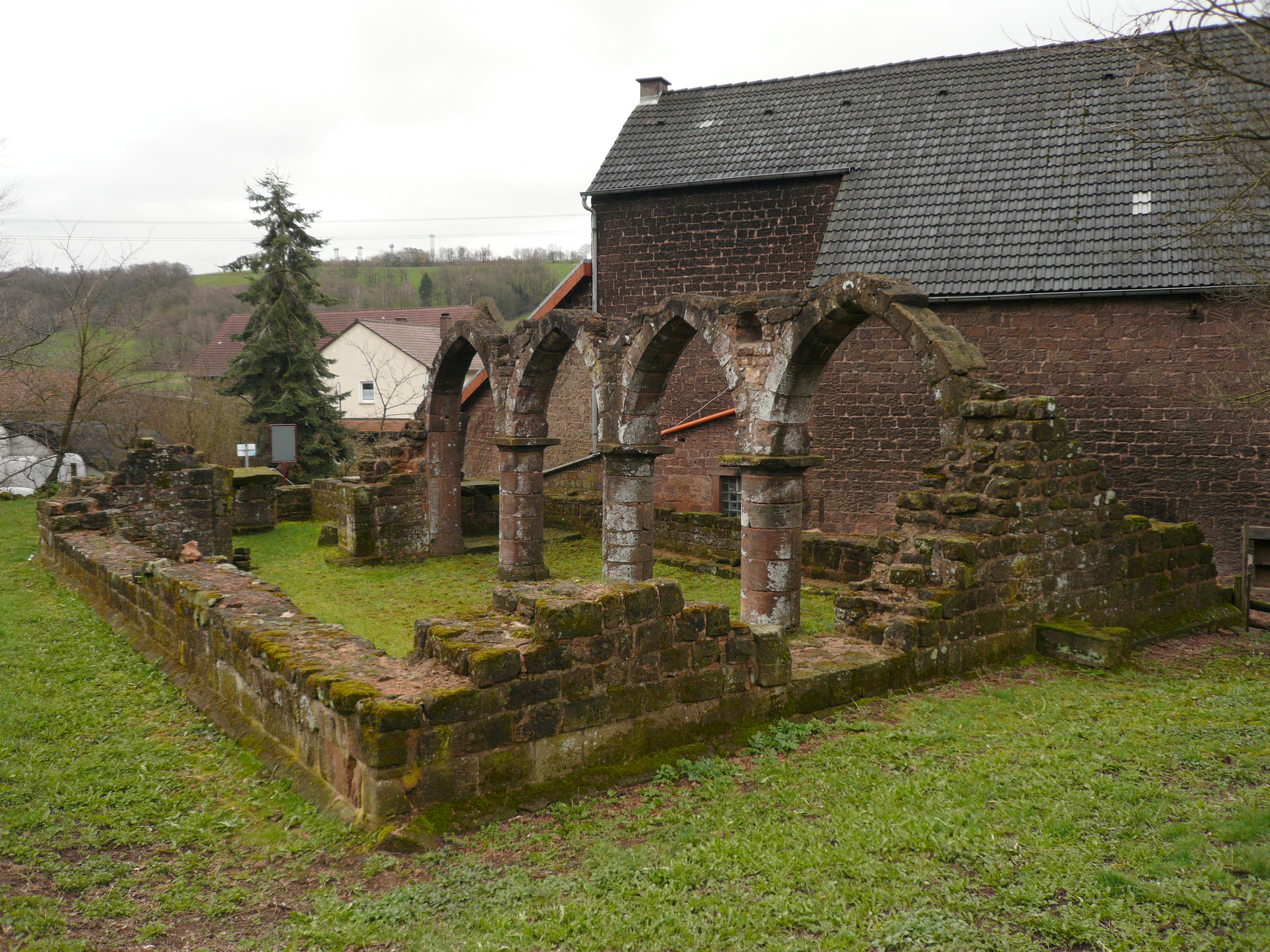
- Ruins of the Verenakapelle

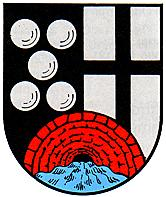
- Coat of arms

- Location of Mittelbrunn within Kaiserslautern district
- Interactive map of Mittelbrunn
- Location within Germany Location within Rhineland-Palatinate
- Coordinates: 49°22′21″N 7°33′05″E
- Country: Germany
- State: Rhineland-Palatinate
- District: Kaiserslautern
- First mentioned: 1230 (796 years ago)

Government
  - Mayor (2019–24): Walter Altherr (CDU)

Area
  - Total: 8.97 km^{2} (3.46 sq mi)
- Elevation: 323 m (1,060 ft)

Population (2025-12-31)
  - Total: 713
  - Density: 79.5/km^{2} (206/sq mi)
- Time zone: UTC+01:00 (CET)
  - Summer (DST): UTC+02:00 (CEST)
- Postal codes: 66851
- Dialling codes: 06371
- Vehicle registration: KL

Mittelbrunn is a municipality in the district of Kaiserslautern, in Rhineland-Palatinate, western Germany.

== Verena Chapel ==
The Verena Chapel (German: Verenakapelle) in Mittelbrunn was first mentioned in 1496. The chapel was partially destroyed in the Thirty Years War (1618–1648). One last service was celebrated in 1718. Since at least the 18th century, the medieval chapel has been a decayed but eloquent presence in art and aesthetics.

== International relations ==
Mittelbrunn is twinned with:

- Saint-Désir-de-Lisieux, France (1981)
