= Gaz de France =

Defunct French natural gas and nuclear power company

- Industry: Energy
- Founded: 1946
- Defunct: 22 July 2008
- Fate: Merger with Suez
- Successor: Engie; Suez Environnement
- Headquarters: 17th arrondissement, Paris, France
- Key people: Jean-François Cirelli (Chairman of the board and CEO)
- Products: Natural gas production, sale and distribution, energy trading
- Revenue: ▲€27.4 billion (2007)
- Net income: €2.5 billion (2007)
- Number of employees: ~30,000 (2007)
- Website: gazdefrance.com

Gaz de France (GDF) was a French company which produced, transported and sold natural gas around the world, especially in France, its main market. The company was also particularly active in Belgium, the United Kingdom, Germany, and other European countries. Through its part-owned Belgian subsidiary SPE it was also involved in nuclear power generation. The company conducted a merger of equals with fellow utility company Suez on 22 July 2008 to form GDF Suez. Its head office was located in the 17th arrondissement of Paris.

== History ==
The head office, rue Philibert Delorme, Paris 17th arr.

Gaz de France was created with its sister company Électricité de France (EDF) in 1946 by the French Government. After the liberalisation of Europe's energy markets, Gaz de France also entered into the electricity sector, having developed combined natural gas-electricity offerings.

With part-privatisation EDF and Gaz de France latterly became two totally separate entities, with each controlling a distribution subsidiary responsible for running its distribution system. For Gaz de France, this was the Gaz de France Distributor. Together, these two distributors managed a joint department, "EDF Gaz de France Distribution" formerly called “EDF GDF Services, which was responsible for field-based activities (meter reading, activating connections, engineering work, etc.). In January 2008 EDF Gaz de France Distribution was split into two entities: ErDF (Électricité réseau distribution France), 100% owned by EDF, and GrDF (Gaz réseau distribution France), wholly owned by Gaz de France (and now by GDF Suez).

The company's capital was partially floated on the Paris Stock Exchange in July 2005, raising €2.5 billion for the State of France. The government continued to hold an approximate 80% stake in the company until the 2008 merger with Suez. The French state now holds approximately 35.7% of GDF Suez.

=== Merger with Suez ===
On 25 February 2006 French Prime minister Dominique de Villepin announced the merger of Suez and GDF, which would make the world's largest liquefied natural gas company. Since the French state owned over 80% of Gaz de France, it was necessary to pass a new law in order to make the merger possible. The merger was overseen by R N Rothschild & Sons Investment Bank.

On 3 September 2007, Gaz de France and Suez announced agreed terms of merger, on the basis of an exchange of 21 Gaz de France shares for 22 Suez shares via the absorption of Suez by Gaz de France. The French state would hold more than 35% of shares of the merged company, GDF Suez.

Whilst Nicolas Sarkozy was for several months opposed to the Villepin government's plans for a merger of the two companies, he subsequently accepted the government proposal. This plan for a merger between Gaz de France and Suez came under fire from the whole of the political left, which feared the loss of one of the last ways of preventing the price rises experienced over the previous three years, and by the social Gaullists and trade unions. In retaliation, the opposition submitted 137,449 amendments to the plan. Under normal parliamentary procedure, parliament would have been required to vote on the amendments, which would have taken 10 years. The French Constitution does give the government options to bypass such a filibuster, but in the end these were not used.

Law No. 2006-1537 of 7 December 2006 on the energy sector authorised the privatisation of Gaz de France. On 2 September 2007 the boards of directors of Gaz de France and Suez approved the new framework for the planned merger between the companies. The newly created company, GDF Suez, came into existence on 22 July 2008; the world's second-largest utility and a group of €74 billion of revenues.

== Former heads of the company ==
- Robert Hirsch: 1970-1975
- Pierre Alby: 1979-1986
- Jacques Fournier: 1986-1988
- Françis Gutmann: 1988-1993
- Loïk Le Floch-Prigent: 1993-1996
- Pierre Gadonneix: 1996-2004
- Jean-François Cirelli: 2004-2008

== Management (2007) ==
- Yves Colliou – Deputy CEO.
- Jean-Marie Dauger – Deputy CEO.
- Stéphane Brimont – CFO.
- Emmanuel Hedde – General Secretary.
- Pierre Clavel – Head of International branch.
- Henri Ducré - CEO Energie France.
- Philippe Saimpert - Head of Human Resources.
- Raphaële Rabatel - Communications manager.
- Jean-Michel Carboni - Head of Central and Eastern Europe.
- Jean-Paul George - President of Cofathec group.

== Head office ==
Gaz de France's head office was located in the 17th arrondissement of Paris. The company took possession of the building, built in the late 1950s, in the early 1960s.
