= Escapade romaine =

- Directed by: Jérémie Carboni
- Written by: Jérémie Carboni
- Produced by: Zerkalo production
- Starring: Daniel Pennac; François Duval (actor)
- Cinematography: Jérémie Carboni
- Edited by: Jérémie Carboni
- Music by: Benjamin Britten
- Release date: 2010
- Running time: 15 minutes
- Country: France
- Language: French

Escapade romaine is a 2010 documentary film by Jérémie Carboni during the tour of Daniel Pennac's reading.

== Synopsis ==
French filmmaker Jérémie Carboni followed French writer Daniel Pennac during rehearsals of Bartleby the scrivener's reading in Pépinière Opéra theatre in Paris. This video describes Daniel Pennac's performance in Rome, during the tour.

== Cast and Crew ==
=== Stars ===
- Daniel Pennac – Himself.
- François Duval – Himself.
