= Marithé + François = Girbaud =

- Directed by: Jérémie Carboni
- Starring: Marithé Bachellerie; François Girbaud; Renzo Rosso; Lilly Wood and The Prick
- Cinematography: Vincent Warnke-Dhérines
- Music by: Moriarty (band)
- Production company: Zerkalo production / Kywan production
- Release date: July 1, 2016
- Running time: 26 minutes
- Country: France
- Languages: French, Italian

Marithé + François = Girbaud is a fashion documentary film directed by Jérémie Carboni about French stylists Marithé et François Girbaud.

== Summary ==
Marithé Bachellerie and François Girbaud are French fashion designers, known in the late 1960s for Stonewash. They are also inventors of new clothing shapes and technologies, including design with laser technology, known as Wattwash.

== Cast ==
- François Girbaud, French stylist
- Marithé Bachellerie, French stylist
- Renzo Rosso, CEO of Diesel brand
- Lilly Wood and The Prick, French pop-electro duo
- Jacques Rozenker, close associate and stylist
- Antoinette "kiki" Rozenker, close associate and stylist
- Jennifer Beals, American actress (archive footage)
