= Battier =

Battier is a French surname. Notable people with the name include:

- Andreas Battier, Swiss pastor
- Henrietta Battier (c. 1751–1813), Irish poet, satirist, and actress
- Jean Battier, Swiss entrepreneur
- Marc Battier (born 1947), French composer and musicologist
- Shane Battier (born 1978), American retired basketball player
