= The Fairy Gunmother =

1987 novel by Daniel Pennac

- First edition cover – original French
- Author: Daniel Pennac
- Original title: La fée carabine
- Translator: Ian Monk
- Language: French
- Genre: Comic novel
- Publisher: Éditions Gallimard
- Publication date: 1987
- Publication place: France
- Pages: 310 pp
- ISBN: 2-07-040370-X
- OCLC: 38580502
- Preceded by: Au bonheur des ogres
- Followed by: La Petite Marchand de prose

The Fairy Gunmother (1987, orig. French: La fée carabine) is a comic novel by the French novelist Daniel Pennac, the second in his Malaussène saga. It, arguably, was the novel that first brought fame to Pennac, his earlier novel Au bonheur des ogres debuting to comparatively muted acclaim. La fée carabine was a critical success, winning three literary awards in 1988: the Trophée 813 for best novel, the Grenoble polar (whodunnit) prize, and that of the city of Mans.

== Plot summary ==
The novel is set in the modern Parisian quarter of Belleville. It starts with the dramatic death of a policeman, shot by a "grannie" he was trying to help, and witnessed by at least four others who conveniently forget all details of what they see. The inspector Van Thian goes undercover as a Vietnamese old woman to investigate. Three other investigations follow: one into the attempted murder of a young woman, another into the serial killings of small old women in the district, and a third into drug trafficking by old men. Benjamin Malaussènne, professional scapegoat, quickly becomes suspect number one of all four investigations, owing to the numerous children of his prolific mother he lives with, the various old men with obsolete talents that he shelters, and his repeated abortive romantic affairs. Like all novels in the Malaussène saga, the setting is anything but conventional, the streets of Paris brimming with immigrants in open celebration of their diversity, the situations rarely Gallic yet authentically Parisian.

== Film, TV or theatrical adaptations ==
La fée carabine was adapted for television in 1988 by Yves Boisset, starring Tom Novembre as Malaussène, Fabrice Luchini, Anna Galiena, Daniel Emilfork and Hubert Deschamps.
