= Jean-Michel Carboni =

CEO, Chairman, Senior executive, CFO, Businessman (born 23 July 1955)

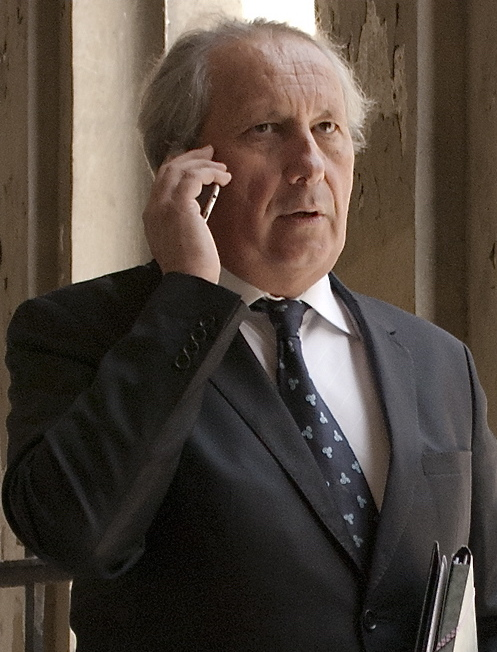
- Jean-Michel Carboni in 2013
- Born: 23 July 1955 (age 71)
- Education: MSc in Finance at ESCP Europe (1974–77)
- Occupations: Treasurer of Gaz de France group (1987); CEO of Cofathec group (today Engie Cofely) (2000); CEO of Gaz de France Central and Eastern Europe (2005); CEO of Engie Italy (2010); Deputy CEO Engie : IT Services and founder/CEO of ENGIE IT (2013); Member of management committee (Top 15) (2013).

Jean-Michel Carboni (born 23 July 1955) is a French chief executive officer, senior official and senior executive in the energy sector within the EDF-GDF, Gaz de France and Engie (€65 billion in 2017) groups, and also a former diplomat. He was a member of the management committee (Top 15) and served as deputy CEO (in charge of IT services) of Engie in 2013.

== Family and education ==
On his mother's side, Carboni is the descendant of the Michau family, belonging to the aristocracy and upper bourgeoisie from Orléans in the Centre-Val de Loire region. Among his ancestors as Joseph-Alexandre Michau (1815–1873), industrialist and mayor of Saint-Pryvé-Saint-Mesmin; Charles-Louis Michau (1835–1908), treasurer and manager of the Savings Bank of Loiret department, then deputy mayor of Orléans and also member of the Académie des Arts, Sciences et Belles Lettres; André Michau (1895–1972), a senior military officer in the French Armed Forces Health Service and Administration Lieutenant (9th Military Region) during the Second World War, was decorated in 1948 by the French government as an Officer and then as a Knight of the Legion of Honor; he died before being awarded the rank of Commander.

The son of Michel Carboni (1916-1977), a Corsican Director-General of Customs, and Germaine Michau, Carboni grew up in the south of France. He later moved to Paris to study and graduated in Finance and Accounting from prestigious ESCP Europe business school, "Sup de Co Paris" (1977 class).

== Career ==
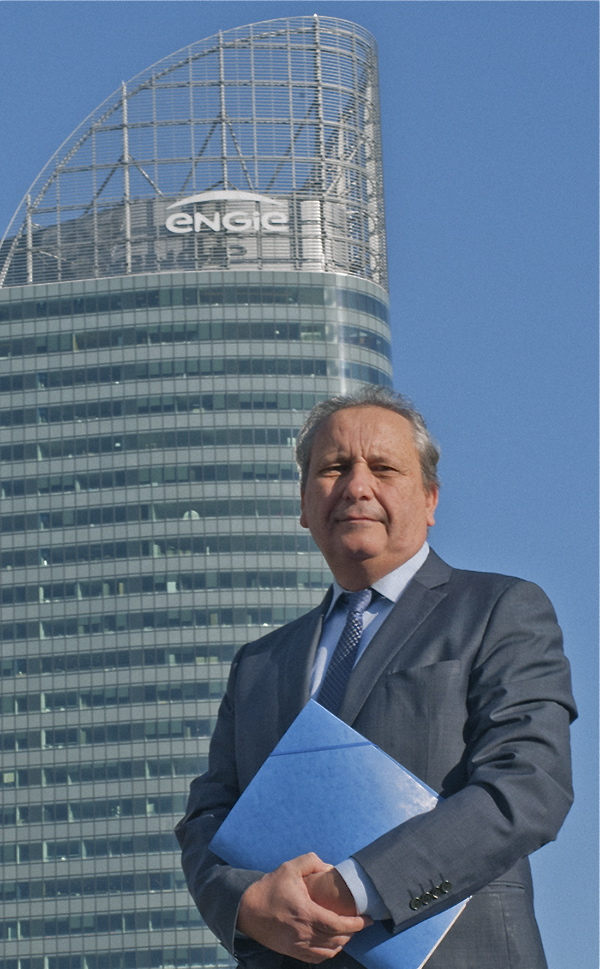
Jean-Michel Carboni, senior executive of Engie group

Carboni began his career in French diplomacy as advisor to the commercial counsellor of the French Embassy in Oslo (Norway), then as trade attaché at French Embassy of Athens (Greece). He returned to France to work in Nestlé's marketing department before joining, in 1979, SAPAR, a subsidiary of the French public group EDF-GDF (EDF: Électricité de France; GDF: Gaz de France today Engie). Within SAPAR (the financial controlling subsidiary of EDF), Carboni served as CFO of several French nuclear power stations, including the Creys-Malville plant. He then joined GDF’s Finance Department as head of Treasury and the trading room (managing assets and debt: €15 billion). In collaboration with CFO Robert Delbos, he modernised EDF-GDF’s financial operations, managed the world’s second-largest swaps portfolio after the World Bank, and was among the pioneers of modern fundraising techniques.

In 1997, Carboni became CEO of COFATHEC Italy (€300M turnover, 3,000 employees) and later CEO of the COFATHEC group, renamed ENGIE Cofely (€2.8bn turnover in 2018); he was also a member of the executive committee of ENGIE Solutions (€10bn turnover in 2020). Between 2001 and 2003, he served as delegate general of the e-compagnie (in charge of new technologies, internet, intranet, and e-purchasing). He returned in 2004 to GDF’s Finance Department to oversee the acquisition of the Romanian group DistriGaz Sud (€500M, 10,000 employees). He was then appointed CFO of the CNIEG (National Pension Fund of Electricity and Gas Industries) to restructure the IEG pension fund (with €1 billion in financing).

Between 2005 and 2007, he served as CFO and CEO of Gaz de France Central and Eastern Europe, overseeing subsidiaries such as Égáz-Dégáz and DistriGaz.

After the 2008 merger of Gaz de France and Suez, forming GDF Suez, Carboni became CEO of the Italian Business Unit (GDF Suez Italy), today known as Engie Italy (2009 revenue: €1.4 billion and two million customers). This Business Unit brings together power plants, gas networks, storage centres, and renewable energy assets.

Between 2010 and 2012, Carboni headed the DSI, GDF Suez’s IT department (€1.35 billion in 2012), with the mission of pooling IT services and creating ENGIE IT (then GDF Suez IT) with initial capital of €45 million. In 2013, ENGIE IT became one of the largest IT subsidiaries in Europe, with €600 million in turnover and 2,700 employees. Carboni served as the group's deputy CEO and as CEO from 2012 to 2015 of ENGIE IT.

In 2016, Carboni was special adviser to Isabelle Kocher (CEO) and Gérard Mestrallet (Chairman) of the Engie Group.

In 2018, he co-founded and chaired an advisory firm specialising in renewable energies.

== Personal life ==
He is the father of three children, including the producer and entrepreneur Jérémie Carboni.
