= Marithé et François Girbaud =

French international clothing company

Marithé + François Girbaud
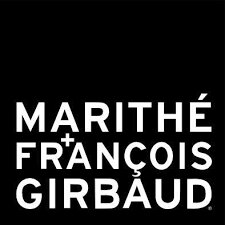

- M + F Girbaud in SM City Baguio, Philippines
- Type: Joint-stock company
- Industry: Fashion
- Founded: Paris, France (1972)
- Founder: François Girbaud; Marithé Bachellerie
- Headquarters: Neuilly-sur-Seine, France
- Key people: Pierre Zelker; Maurice Chorenslup; Jacques Rozenker
- Products: Clothes : jeans, coat, etc.
- Revenue: €900 million (1990); €200 million (2012)
- Parent: Mad Lane
- Subsidiaries: Matricule 11342 (1975); Compagnie des Montagnes et des forêts (1975); Closed (1976); Compléments (1979); Maillaparty (1979) etc
- Website: www.girbaud.com

Marithé + François Girbaud is an international clothing company based in France and founded by stylists François Girbaud and Marithé Bachellerie in 1972. They created several brands : Compagnie des montagnes et des forêts, Ça, Closed, Matricule 11342, etc. They are world-known especially for industrialization of the stonewash (stone washing process), baggy trousers and skin-tight jeans.

== History ==
The fashion duo began their career working in the Parisian clothes shop Western House, in 1964. Then Maurice Chorenslup, Pierre Zelcer and Jacques Rozenker helped the couple to create their first brands.

The 1980s to 1990s were the decades of biggest successes for the French brand, with a $900 million worldwide turnover. In 2010, the group was still generating €200 million of revenue.

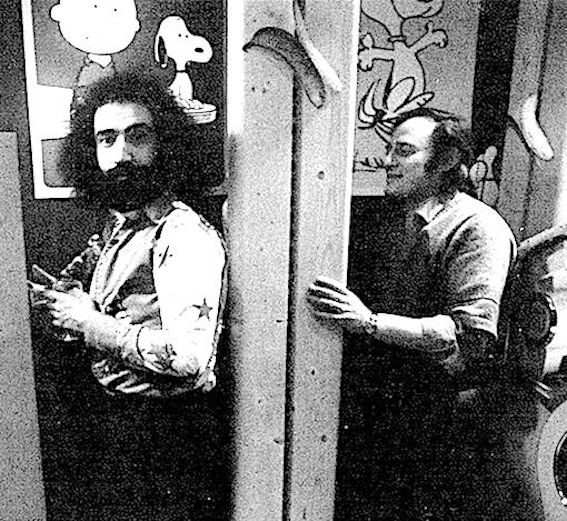
François Girbaud and Jacques Rozenker (1974).

In 1983, the Girbaud duo created costumes for Jennifer Beals and Michael Nouri, actors in the Flashdance movie.

In 1992, Kris Kross, the rap/hip hop duo known for hit song "Jump", were wearing Girbaud's jeans in their music video.

In 1995, Marithé et François began using new cutting and assembly techniques: laser, ultra-sound, techno-fusion. They then launched the new bleu éternel process (1997), which prevents indigo denim from fading. The garment remains soft, comfortable and retains its main properties: depth and authenticity of color. Wattwash, the laser treatment of denim, artificially ages the fabric and reduces water consumption by 97.5%. This provides an opportunity to raise consumers' ecological awareness.

In June 2012, it was reported that Girbaud had filed for bankruptcy and that its websites were down.

In 2015, Marithé Bachellerie and François Girbaud created a new company named Mad Lane (an itinerant concept store) but were still using the original name Marithé + François Girbaud.

== Filmography ==
- 2017 : Marithé + François = Girbaud : film documentary directed by Jérémie Carboni starring Marithé Bachellerie, François Girbaud, Renzo Rosso (CEO of Diesel brand), Benjamin Cotto from Lilly Wood and the Prick band, Jacques Rozenker, Jennifer Beals, etc. Songs are from Moriarty band
