= Jérémie Carboni =

French film producer (born 1980)

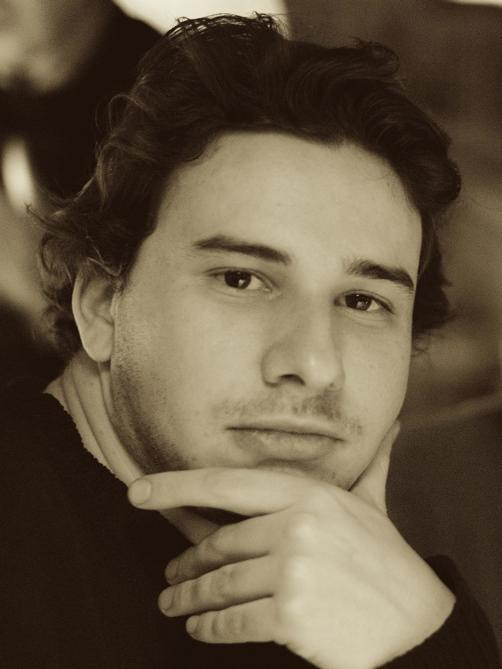
- Jérémie Carboni (2009)
- Born: 28 December 1980 (age 45); France
- Education: Accademia di belle arti di Roma - Rome University of Fine Arts; CLCF
- Occupations: Film producer, Film director; Theatrical producer; Photographer; Entrepreneur
- Years active: 2005–present
- Relatives: Jean-Michel Carboni (Father)

Jérémie Carboni (born 28 December 1980) is a French film producer, director, photographer, and entrepreneur.

== Family and Education ==
Through his paternal grandmother, he descends from the aristocratic Michau family of Orléans, which includes senior political, business, and military figures. He is a cousin of actor Bruno Rozenker and related to the Pierre-Bloch family, politicians, member of the French Resistance and cultural figures, including a minister, impresario, and press attaché, who were friends of artists such as Johnny Hallyday, Michel Sardou, Alain Delon and Josephine Baker. On his father’s side, he is the grandson of Michel Carboni (1916–1977), a senior customs official in charge of the South of France, and on his mother’s side, of Jacques Rozenker (1932–2014), a textile entrepreneur who collaborated with singer Sylvie Vartan and helped launch French designers Marithé + François Girbaud.

Carboni is the son of Jean-Michel Carboni, a former diplomat, senior executive at Gaz de France, and deputy CEO of Engie, and of a classical pianist. His family lived in Norway, France, Greece, Hungary, and Italy, where he resided for six years and attended the Lycée français Chateaubriand in Rome. He later studied at the Accademia di Belle Arti di Roma and the Rome University of Fine Arts, before completing a degree in filmmaking in Paris. He also undertook short-term studies in Political science.

== Film and Theatre career ==
Carboni began his career as a production assistant and assistant director for producers Stéphane Tchalgadjieff and Danièle Gégauff, who collaborated with directors such as Michelangelo Antonioni, Marguerite Duras, Wim Wenders, Wong Kar Wai, and Steven Soderbergh. He later served as head of development.

His first film was the documentary Bartleby en coulisses, which focuses on the theatrical work of writer Daniel Pennac in connection with a reading-performance of Bartleby, the Scrivener, a novella by Herman Melville, staged at the Théâtre de la Pépinière in 2009. In 2013, Carboni founded and became president of Compagnie MIA (Mouvement International Artistique), a theatre company established to produce shows by French writer Daniel Pennac, including Journal d’un corps, L’œil du loup, and Un amour exemplaire. In the same year, he directed his second film, a history of electronic music featuring composers Jean Michel Jarre, Émilie Simon, Teho Teardo, Moriarty (band) and François Bayle. The film was selected for and screened on 19 June 2013 at the MusiquePointDoc film festival, held at La Gaîté Lyrique in Paris. In 2017, his third film was a portrait of French fashion designers Marithé et François Girbaud, known for popularizing skin-tight jeans, baggy trousers, and the industrialization of the stone-washing process. He also directed a tribute film on French writer Michel Déon, a member of the Académie française and of the literary movement Les Hussards, which emerged in the 1950s. Notably, Michel Déon, Jean d'Ormesson, Milan Kundera, Emmanuel Carrère, Xavier Darcos, Yves Boisset, Éric Neuhoff, and Antoine Gallimard participated in the film.

== Filmography ==
=== As Director ===
Year	Title	Notes
2005	Réunion de famille	Short film
2010	Bartleby en coulisses	Documentary film about the French writer Daniel Pennac
2010	Notre Terre	Music Video performed by Cynthia Brown (singer) (Universal Music)
2010	Bartleby le scribe	Video recording of a theatrical reading performed by Daniel Pennac
2011	La Place du passager	Music video performed by Dominique Fidanza (Universal Music)
2013	Musique(s) électronique(s)	Documentary film featuring Jean-Michel Jarre, Émilie Simon, Moriarty and others. Festival selections: Musiquepointdoc at the La Gaîté Lyrique; RIDM
2016	Long is the Night	Music video performed by Moriarty (Air Rytmo – Shot in 360° virtual reality at the Louvre museum)
2017	Marithé + François = Girbaud	Documentary film about the French designers inventors of skinny jeans, Baggy trousers and the industrialization of stone washing
2023	Michel Déon ou la force de l'amitié	Documentary film about the French writer Michel Déon, member of the Académie française and of the literary movement named Les Hussards

=== As Producer ===
Year	Title	Notes
2008	National prevention campaign against violence targeting young people and seniors	Producer with ACSE and RATP
2010	Bartleby en coulisses	Featuring French writer Daniel Pennac - Co-producer with France Télévisions Distribution
2013	Musique(s) électronique(s)	Featuring Jean-Michel Jarre, Émilie Simon, Teho Teardo - Co-producer
2014	Point d’orgue	Documentary directed by Vincent Warnke-Dhérines - Co-producer
2023	Michel Déon ou la force de l’amitié	Featuring Michel Déon, Milan Kundera, Jean d'Ormesson, Emmanuel Carrère, Jean-Marie Rouart and Éric Neuhoff - Coproducer
2026	L'Eternelle lumière du jour	Featuring Claudio Amendola and directed by Lorenzo Giovenga - Producer consultant

=== As Actor ===
Year	Title	Role	Notes
2004	La Politique de l'amour	The lover	Short film directed by Salvino Raco
2012	Augustine	Bourneville’s colleague	Directed by Alice Winocour
2016	Eternity	The concert guest	Directed by Trần Anh Hùng

=== Musique(s) électronique(s) ===
His most notable documentary, Musique(s) électronique(s): les bruitistes et leur descendance, filmed between 2010 and 2012, explores the history of electronic and experimental music and was released in 2013. The film covers the history of electronic music, musique concrète, and experimental music, ranging from Luigi Russolo's 1913 manifesto The Art of Noises to the contemporary generation. Composers, including Jean Michel Jarre, Emilie Simon, François Bayle, Michel Chion, Christian Zanési, and Teho Teardo, discuss how and why they composed electronic music pieces. The film premiered in Paris on 19 June 2013 at the La Gaîté Lyrique theatre.

The cast included:

- Jean-Michel Jarre, electronic music composer
- Émilie Simon, composer and French singer of electronic music
- Moriarty, with Stéphan Zimmerli, a member of the band
- Teho Teardo, composer
- François Bayle, composer and former CEO of the Groupe de Recherches Musicales (GRM)
- Christian Zanési, composer and CEO of GRM
- Michel Chion, composer, musicologist, and professor at the University of Paris III: Sorbonne Nouvelle
- Frank Madlener, CEO of Ircam
- Marc Battier, composer, co-founder of the Electroacoustic Music Studies (EMS), and musicologist at the Sorbonne

== Theatre career (Compagnie MIA) ==
In 2013, following an initiative by French writer Daniel Pennac, Carboni co-founded Compagnie MIA (with Laurent Natrella of the Comédie-Française) and became its president. The company was established to produce shows based on and featuring Daniel Pennac's books or ideas. Carboni stepped down from his managerial role at the end of 2019.

- 2012–2015: Journal d'un corps, written by and performed by Daniel Pennac (Théâtre des Bouffes du Nord)
- 2014–2015: L'Oeil du loup (Eye of the Wolf), written by Daniel Pennac and featuring Malian actor Habib Dembélé (Maison des Métallos, Paris)
- 2015: Manèges, written by Laura Alcoba
- 2017–2019: Un Amour exemplaire, with Daniel Pennac (Teatro Bellini, Naples)
- 2019: Le Cas Malaussène, by Daniel Pennac

== Photography ==
Carboni is also a photographer, and his work has been exhibited in France and Italy. He has received two Honorable Mentions in international photography competitions and has photographed several public figures, including Edgar Morin and Daniel Pennac.

- 2001: Group exhibition, Academy of Fine Arts in Rome, Italy.
- 2002: Group exhibition, "Mezzo litro di...", Civic Museum of Marino, Lazio, Italy.
- 2006: Group exhibition, Galerie Thuillier, Paris, France.

== Political and Business advisor ==
- Carboni also worked occasionally in politics as a communications and audiovisual advisor for the République solidaire party, founded by former Prime Minister Dominique de Villepin, for centrist political parties, and for Maliyéanbêdétayé, the Malian political movement of Habib Dembélé.
- In 2018, Carboni co-founded and became CEO of a consulting firm specializing in renewable energy.
