= Bartleby, the Scrivener =

Short story by Herman Melville

"Bartleby, the Scrivener: A Story of Wall Street"
- Short story by Herman Melville
- Country: United States
- Language: English
- Genre: Short story

Publication
- Published in: Putnam's Magazine
- Publication type: Periodical
- Publication date: November–December 1853
- Pages: 45

"Bartleby, the Scrivener: A Story of Wall Street" is a short story by American writer Herman Melville, first serialized anonymously in two parts in the November and December 1853 issues of Putnam's Magazine and reprinted with minor textual alterations in his The Piazza Tales in 1856. In the story, a Wall Street lawyer hires a new clerk, who, after an initial bout of hard work, refuses to make copies or do any other task required of him, responding to any request with the words "I would prefer not to", which become all he says.

The story is told by its narrator between 1848 (as it takes place after the death of John Jacob Astor) and 1853 (the year the story was first published). The instigating event in the story is the narrator being conferred the office of a Master of Chancery, indicating the action of the story takes place before 1847.

Numerous critical essays have been published about the story; scholar Robert Milder describes the story as "unquestionably the masterpiece of the short fiction" in the Melville canon.

== Plot ==
The narrator is an unnamed elderly lawyer who works with legal documents and has an office on Wall Street in New York. In his employ are two scriveners, nicknamed Turkey and Nippers, whose ages are 60 and 25, as well as an errand boy nicknamed Ginger Nut, age 12. He then takes on another scrivener, Bartleby.

At first, Bartleby produces a large volume of high-quality work, but one day, when asked to help proofread a document, Bartleby answers with what soon becomes his perpetual response to every request: "I would prefer not to." To the dismay of the narrator and the irritation of the other employees, Bartleby begins to perform fewer and fewer tasks and eventually none. He instead spends long periods of time staring out one of the office's windows at a brick wall. The narrator makes several attempts to reason with Bartleby or to learn something about him, but never has any success. When the narrator stops by the office one Sunday morning, he discovers that Bartleby is living there. He is saddened by the thought of the life the young man must lead.

Tension builds as business associates wonder why Bartleby is always present in the office, yet does not appear to do any work. Sensing the threat to his reputation, but emotionally unable to evict Bartleby, the narrator moves his business to a different building. The new tenant of his old office comes to ask for help in removing Bartleby, and the narrator tells the man that he is not responsible for his former employee. A week or so after this, several other tenants of the narrator's former office building come to him with their landlord because Bartleby is still making a nuisance of himself; though he has been put out of the office, he sits on the building stairs all day and sleeps in its doorway at night. The narrator agrees to visit Bartleby and attempts to reason with him. He suggests several jobs that Bartleby might try and even invites Bartleby to live with him until they figure out a better solution, but Bartleby declines these offers. The narrator leaves the building and flees the neighborhood for several days, so as not to be bothered by the landlord and tenants.

When the narrator returns to work, he learns that the landlord has called the police. The officers have arrested Bartleby and imprisoned him in the Tombs, or "the Hall of Justice", as a vagrant. He goes to visit Bartleby, who spurns him, and bribes a cook to make sure Bartleby gets enough food. The narrator returns a few days later to check on Bartleby and discovers him dead of starvation, having preferred not to eat.

Months later, the narrator hears a rumor that Bartleby had once worked in a dead letter office and reflects on how this might have affected him. The story ends with the narrator saying, "Ah Bartleby! Ah humanity!"

== Composition ==
Melville's major source of inspiration for the story was an advertisement for a new book, The Lawyer's Story, printed in the Tribune and the Times on February 18, 1853. The book, published anonymously later that year, was written by popular novelist James A. Maitland. This advertisement included the complete first chapter, which started: "In the summer of 1843, having an extraordinary quantity of deeds to copy, I engaged, temporarily, an extra copying clerk, who interested me considerably, in consequence of his modest, quiet, gentlemanly demeanor, and his intense application to his duties." Melville biographer Hershel Parker said nothing else in the chapter besides this "remarkably evocative sentence" was notable. Critic Andrew Knighton said Melville may have been influenced by an obscure work from 1846, Robert Grant White's Law and Laziness: or, Students at Law of Leisure, which features an idle scrivener, while Christopher Sten suggests that Melville found inspiration in Ralph Waldo Emerson's essays, particularly "The Transcendentalist", which shows parallels to "Bartleby".

Melville may have written the story as an emotional response to the bad reviews garnered by Pierre, his preceding novel. Financial difficulties may also have played a part: Moby-Dick and Pierre sold so poorly that Melville was in debt to his publisher Harper and Brothers.

== Publication history ==
The story was first published anonymously as "Bartleby, the Scrivener: A Story of Wall-Street" in two installments in Putnam's Monthly Magazine, in November and December 1853. It was included in Melville's The Piazza Tales, published by Dix and Edwards in the United States in May 1856 and in Britain in June.

== Interpretation ==
The narrator and the text do not explicitly explain the reason for Bartleby's behavior, leaving it open to interpretation.

=== Bartleby's demeanor ===
A 1978 article in ELH posits that Bartleby shows classic symptoms of depression, such as his lack of motivation. He is a passive person, and good at the work he agrees to do. He refuses to divulge any personal information to the narrator. Bartleby's death is consistent with depression—having no motivation to survive, he refrains from eating until he dies.

In 1993, Thomas Pynchon described it as "the first great epic of modern Sloth".

=== Function of narrator ===
Bartleby has been interpreted as a "psychological double" for the narrator who criticizes the "sterility, impersonality, and mechanical adjustments of the world which the lawyer inhabits". Until the end of the story, Bartleby's background is unknown and may have sprung from the narrator's mind. The narrator screens off Bartleby in a corner, which has been interpreted as symbolizing "the lawyer's compartmentalization of the unconscious forces which Bartleby represents".

Psychoanalyst Christopher Bollas says the main focus of the story is the narrator, whose "willingness to tolerate [Bartleby's] work stoppage is what needs to be explained ... As the story proceeds, it becomes increasingly clear that the lawyer identifies with his clerk. To be sure, it is an ambivalent identification, but that only makes it all the more powerful."

=== Autobiography ===
Scholars have long explored the possibility that Bartleby serves as an autobiographical portrait. Lawrence Buell suggested that the scrivener may reflect Melville as disenchanted writer or artist, Leo Marx connected the story's theme of alienation with Melville's experiences and feelings of isolation, and Giles Gunn posited that Melville's personal struggles and disillusionment with the literary world influenced his portrayal of Bartleby as a withdrawn and passive character.

=== Free will and ethics ===
"Bartleby, the Scrivener" alludes to Jonathan Edwards's "Inquiry into the Freedom of the Will" and Jay Leyda, in his introduction to The Complete Stories of Herman Melville, comments on the similarities between Bartleby and The Doctrine of Philosophical Necessity by Joseph Priestley. Both Edwards and Priestley wrote about free will and determinism. Edwards states that free will requires the will to be isolated from the moment of decision, in which case Bartleby's isolation from the world would allow him to be completely free. He has the ability to do whatever he pleases. The reference to Priestley and Edwards in connection with determinism may suggest that Bartleby's exceptional exercise of his personal will, though it leads to his death, spares him from an externally determined fate.

"Bartleby" is also seen as an inquiry into ethics. Critic John Matteson sees the story (and other Melville works) as explorations of the changing meaning of 19th-century "prudence". The story's narrator "struggles to decide whether his ethics will be governed by worldly prudence or Christian agape". He wants to be humane, as shown by his accommodations of the four staff and especially of Bartleby, but this conflicts with the newer, pragmatic and economically based notion of prudence supported by changing legal theory. The 1850 case Brown v. Kendall, three years before the story's publication, was important in establishing the "reasonable man" standard in the United States, and emphasized the positive action required to avoid negligence. Bartleby's passivity has no place in a legal and economic system that increasingly sides with the "reasonable" and economically active individual. His fate, an innocent decline into unemployment, prison, and starvation, dramatizes the effect of the new prudence on the economically inactive members of society.

== Reception ==
Though no great success at the time of publication, "Bartleby, the Scrivener" is now among the most noted of American short stories.

On November 5, 2019, the BBC News listed "Bartleby, the Scrivener" on its list of the 100 most influential novels.

In a 2025 "Read Your Way Through New York City" feature for The New York Times, Hernan Diaz called it a "quintessential New York book", describing it as a tale of an "unclassifiable weirdo who is always on the verge of being crushed by an ever-expanding city ruled by profit and... the compassionate mensch who tries to come to his aid".

== Adaptations and references ==
=== Adaptations ===
- The York Playhouse produced a one-act opera, Bartleby, composed by William Flanagan and James J. Hinton Jr. with a libretto by Edward Albee, from January 1 to February 28, 1961.
- The first filmed adaptation was by the Encyclopædia Britannica Educational Corporation in 1969. It was adapted, produced, and directed by Larry Yust and starred James Westerfield and Patrick Campbell, with Barry Williams of The Brady Bunch fame in a small role. The story has been adapted for film four other times as Bartleby:
  - in 1970, starring Paul Scofield;
  - in 1976, in France, by Maurice Ronet, starring Michel Lonsdale;
  - in 1977, by Israel Horovitz and Michael B Styer for Maryland Center for Public Broadcasting, starring Nicholas Kepros, which was an entry in the 1978 Peabody Awards competition for television;
  - and in 2001, by Jonathan Parker, starring Crispin Glover and David Paymer.
- The first BBC Radio 4 adaptation dramatised by Martyn Wade, directed by Cherry Cookson, and broadcast in 2004 stars Adrian Scarborough as Bartleby, Ian Holm as the Lawyer, David Collings as Turkey, and Jonathan Keeble as Nippers.
- Another BBC radio 4 production was a reading of the story by Alex Jennings, broadcast in 2025.
- In 2009, French author Daniel Pennac read the story on the stage of La Pépinière-Théâtre in Paris.
- The story was adapted for the stage in 2020 by Juhan Ulfsak for Von Krahl Theatre in Estonia as Pigem ei (literal translation: "Rather not").

=== References to the story ===
==== Literature ====
- Arthur C. Clarke references the character of Bartleby in his 1983 novel 2010: Odyssey Two, comparing the computer HAL to "Melville's autistic scrivener".
- Bartleby: La formula della creazione (1993) by Giorgio Agamben and Bartleby, ou la formule by Gilles Deleuze are two philosophical essays reconsidering many of Melville's ideas.
- The story features prominently in Stephen King's 1998 novel Bag of Bones. The final line of the book references Bartleby's phrase "I prefer not to".
- Bartleby & Co. (2000), novel by Enrique Vila-Matas is named after and prominently references the character.
- Abdulrazak Gurnah references "Bartleby, the Scrivener" throughout his 2001 novel By the Sea. The protagonist, Saleh Omar, quotes Bartleby's mantra to explain his decision to abstain from speaking English on seeking asylum in the UK.
- Jeff Smith's comic-book series Bone features a "rat creature" named Bartleby who declines to partake in the violence and savagery of his feral brethren. The Melville connection is reinforced by the fact that Moby-Dick is the series protagonist's favorite novel.

==== Film and television ====
In addition to the direct film adaptations listed above:

- Head of the Class Season Four, Episode 20, "The Quiet Kid" (February 28, 1990) introduces the character Jasper Kwong (Ke Huy Quan), who keeps saying "I would prefer not to" when asked to join the academic team. Eventually, Mr. Moore (Howard Hesseman) confronts him, knowing that he's quoting "Bartleby, the Scrivener." Eventually it comes out that Jasper had challenged another kid to a rooftop chess game, and the kid jumped off the roof after losing, and rumors had spread that Jasper had killed a guy, so he had changed schools multiple times to escape the rumor.
- In 2011, French director Jérémie Carboni made the documentary Bartleby en coulisses around Daniel Pennac's reading of "Bartleby, the Scrivener".
- In 2018, Miles Luna, one of the lead creators of and a writer for RWBY, revealed that the creatures called Apathy that appeared in the episode "Alone in the Woods" of Volume 6 were inspired by Bartleby's apathetic behavior in the story. Additionally, the writer of a series of diaries in the episode is named Bartleby.
- The quote "I would prefer not to" is used multiple times in The Bride! (2026) and the characters discuss the quote, its origins and meaning during a meal.

==== Other ====
- Lively Arts Records released James Mason Reads Herman Melville's Bartleby The Scrivener (LA 30007) on LP in 1960; this recording was also released on LP by Listening Library, Inc. (AA 3331)
- The electronic text archive bartleby.com is named "after the humble character of its namesake scrivener, or copyist—publishes the classics of literature, nonfiction, and reference free of charge."
- The British newspaper magazine The Economist maintains a column named "Bartleby" focused on managers trying to understand how to motivate their employees and to empathize with employees who "carry out their bosses' often-bewildering orders, even when they would 'prefer not to'."
- The 92nd Street Y presented a livestreamed and on-demand reading of the story by actor Paul Giamatti in November 2020. A December 3, 2020, conversation between Giamatti and Andrew Delbanco is archived on YouTube.
- Horris Records released the track Bartleby, the Scrivener, performed by MC Lars and Mega Ran, on June 7, 2019.

== See also ==
- Interpassivity
- Dissociative fugue
- Pseudowork
- Refusal of work
- Slacker
- John C. Colt, law clerk who murdered Samuel Adams; Colt and Adams are mentioned in the story
- Office Space

== Sources ==
- Jaffé, David (1981). "Bartleby the Scrivener and Bleak House: Melville's Debt to Dickens". Arlington, Virginia: The Mardi Press.
- McCall, Dan (1989). The Silence of Bartleby. Ithaca and London: Cornell University Press. ISBN 0-8014-9593-8
- Parker, Hershel (2002). Herman Melville: A Biography. Vol. 2. The Johns Hopkins University Press. ISBN 0801868920.
- Sealts, Merton M. (1987). "Historical Note". In MacDougall, Alma A.; Hayford, Harrison M.; Tanselle, G. Thomas (eds.). The Piazza Tales and Other Prose Pieces, 1839-1860. Northwestern University Press. ISBN 0-8101-0550-0.
- "Introduction", A Study Guide for Herman Melville's Bartleby the Scrivener, Gale, 2015, ISBN 978-1410337016
- "Plot summary", A Study Guide for Herman Melville's Bartleby the Scrivener, Gale, 2015, ISBN 978-1410337016
