= Bartleby en coulisses =

- Directed by: Jérémie Carboni
- Written by: Jérémie Carboni
- Produced by: Zerkalo production
- Starring: Daniel Pennac; François Duval
- Cinematography: Jérémie Carboni
- Edited by: Jérémie Carboni
- Music by: Benjamin Britten
- Distributed by: France Télévisions Distribution
- Release date: 2009
- Running time: 52 minutes
- Country: France
- Language: French

Bartleby en coulisses (French for "Bartleby behind the scenes") is a documentary film shot in 2009 by the filmmaker Jérémie Carboni.

== Production ==
At the beginning of 2007, French filmmaker Jérémie Carboni followed French writer Daniel Pennac to film during rehearsals for a reading of Bartleby, the Scrivener in Pépinière Opéra theatre in France. Bartleby, the Scrivener is a story by Herman Melville. Initially, the footage focused on François Duval's work directing, but after the premiere of the show, Carboni edited the footage into a documentary, adding other interviews.

== Cast and crew ==
=== Stars ===
- Daniel Pennac - Himself
- François Duval - Himself

=== Director/scriptwriter/editor ===
- Jérémie Carboni
