= Bartleby (2001 film) =

2001 film by Jonathan Parker

- DVD cover
- Directed by: Jonathan Parker
- Written by: Herman Melville; Jonathan Parker; Catherine DiNapoli
- Based on: Bartleby, the Scrivener by Herman Melville
- Produced by: Debbie Brubaker; Catherine DiNapoli
- Starring: David Paymer; Crispin Glover; Glenne Headly; Maury Chaykin; Joe Piscopo
- Cinematography: Wah Ho Chan
- Edited by: Rick LeCompte
- Music by: Seth Asarnow; Jonathan Parker
- Release date: March 10, 2001 (SXSW)
- Running time: 83 minutes
- Country: United States
- Language: English

Bartleby is a 2001 American comedy-drama film adaptation of Herman Melville's short story "Bartleby, the Scrivener". The film was directed by Jonathan Parker, and stars Crispin Glover as Bartleby, and David Paymer as his boss. The film diverges from Melville's story, setting it in a modern office and adding sitcom-style humor, but maintaining an element of surrealism.

== Plot ==
The film opens with a brief summary of Herman Melville's life; with his popularity on the decline after writing "Moby-Dick", Melville could no longer make a living as an author and took a job as a customs clerk in New York City. By the time he died in 1891, almost nobody knew who he was.

While driving to work one day, the manager of a public records office (never addressed by name and hereafter referred to as the Boss) sees a man standing on an overpass. The Boss's office is in a building on top of a large hill completely inaccessible by foot, and he employs three people: Ernest, an overweight and neurotic klutz; Rocky, who dresses and acts like a mobster; and Vivian, his verbose, flirtatious, and bluntly honest receptionist. To prepare for an upcoming increase in workload, the Boss posts a job opening for a fourth employee, but the only person who applies is the man from the overpass, the titular Bartleby.

Bartleby explains in his interview that he worked at a dead letter office for eight years until the office moved, but otherwise gives vague answers to the Boss's questions. Bartleby's quiet and off-kilter demeanor unsettles him, but having no other options, the Boss hires him. Bartleby is initially a model employee and boon to the office, getting a week's worth of work done in just a few days, but when asked to help verify important documents, he refuses, responding with what becomes his answer to virtually every request: "I would prefer not to." To the staff's dismay and irritation, Bartleby refuses to do anything except his sole task of filing away documents and spends long periods of time staring at a vent above his desk that vibrates loudly. When the Boss brings a date to the office after hours, Bartleby walks in on them, leading the Boss to discover that he has begun living there.

The Boss makes several attempts to reason with Bartleby and learn about him, wondering what sort of life he must lead; he also realizes he and the staff have started frequently using the word "prefer" in their vocabularies. Bartleby soon refuses to do any more filing, now doing nothing at all and claiming he has "given up working", so the Boss fires Bartleby and gives him until Friday night to leave the office. When the Boss returns Monday morning, he finds that Bartleby has not left, and tensions start to rise as one of the Boss's associates catches the staff bullying Bartleby and wonders why he doesn't do any work. Understanding the threat to his reputation but unable to bring himself to evict Bartleby, the Boss moves his office to another building upon realizing Bartleby's previous employers moved to get rid of him. Before he departs, the Boss gives Bartleby a letter of recommendation to help him find a new job, while a repairman removes a dead bird from the vent above Bartleby's desk.

Both the Boss's former landlord and the new owner of the old office soon come to demand his help with Bartleby; though he was thrown out of the office, he will not leave the building and is now sleeping in the lobby. The Boss insists that Bartleby is no longer his problem but relents under the pressure. Trying again to reason with him, the Boss offers to help Bartleby find a job he would like, but he declines every suggestion, and after the Boss leaves, he is arrested and released onto the streets.

When the Boss learns of this, he goes searching for Bartleby and finds him weak and delirious from starvation in a homeless camp, having preferred not to eat anymore. To his own surprise, the Boss invites Bartleby to come live with him until they can make better arrangements, but Bartleby no longer wants anything to do with him. The Boss rushes to a nearby soup kitchen and tries to convince a cook to make sure Bartleby gets fed, but the man is unsympathetic to Bartleby's plight and forces the Boss to wait in a long line. By the time he returns with food, Bartleby has died. Finding his letter of recommendation in Bartleby's coat, the Boss bitterly realizes it is now a dead letter, stumbling away in despair and finding his way to the same overpass where he first saw Bartleby.

Sometime afterwards, the Boss has resigned from his job and written a memoir which includes his time with Bartleby. The publishing agent he pitches it to, however, finds the subject matter concerning Bartleby too depressing for her tastes and refuses to publish it. The Boss flies into a rage, demanding that Bartleby's story be told, and when the agent tells him to leave, he retorts "I would prefer not to!" Rattled by this, the agent simply tells him to stay there as she leaves. Realizing the impact Bartleby has had on his own life and finding his gaze drawn to a nearby vent that starts vibrating, the Boss shouts the phrase again and again as the film closes with a shot of several office buildings, all isolated on top of large hills like his old office.

== Cast ==
- David Paymer as The Boss
- Crispin Glover as Bartleby
- Glenne Headly as Vivian
- Maury Chaykin as Ernest
- Joe Piscopo as Rocky
- Seymour Cassel as Frank Waxman
- Carrie Snodgress as Book Publisher
- Dick Martin as The Mayor

== Reception ==
On the review aggregator website Rotten Tomatoes, 36% of 55 critics' reviews are positive, with an average rating of 5.3/10. The website's consensus reads: "Bartleby is a rather dull affair, stretched over a too-long running time." Metacritic, which uses a weighted average, assigned the film a score of 48 out of 100, based on 19 critics, indicating "mixed or average" reviews.
