= Christian Zanési =

French composer (born 1952)

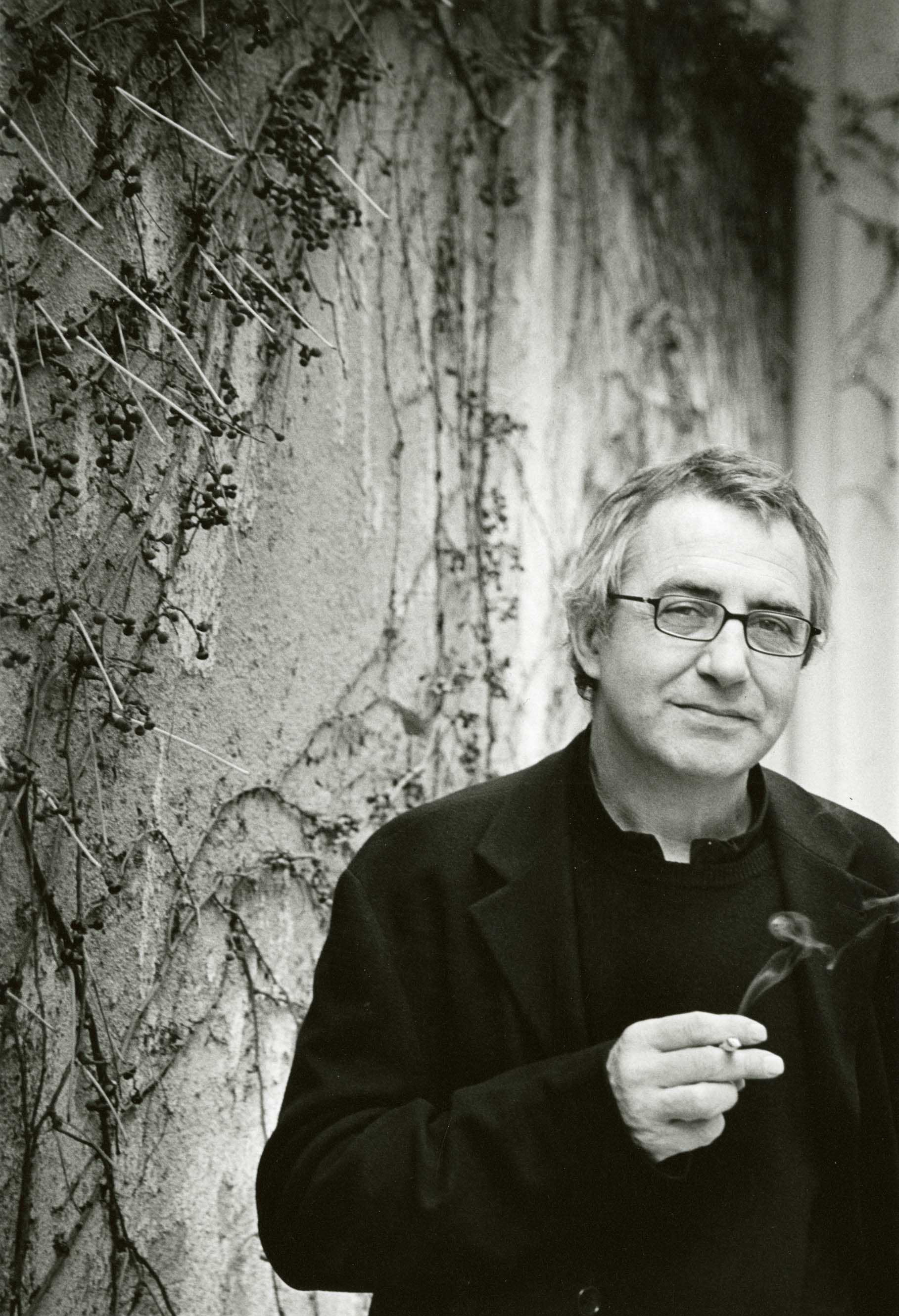
- Born: May 22, 1952 (age 73); Lourdes, France
- Education: Conservatoire de Paris
- Occupation: Composer

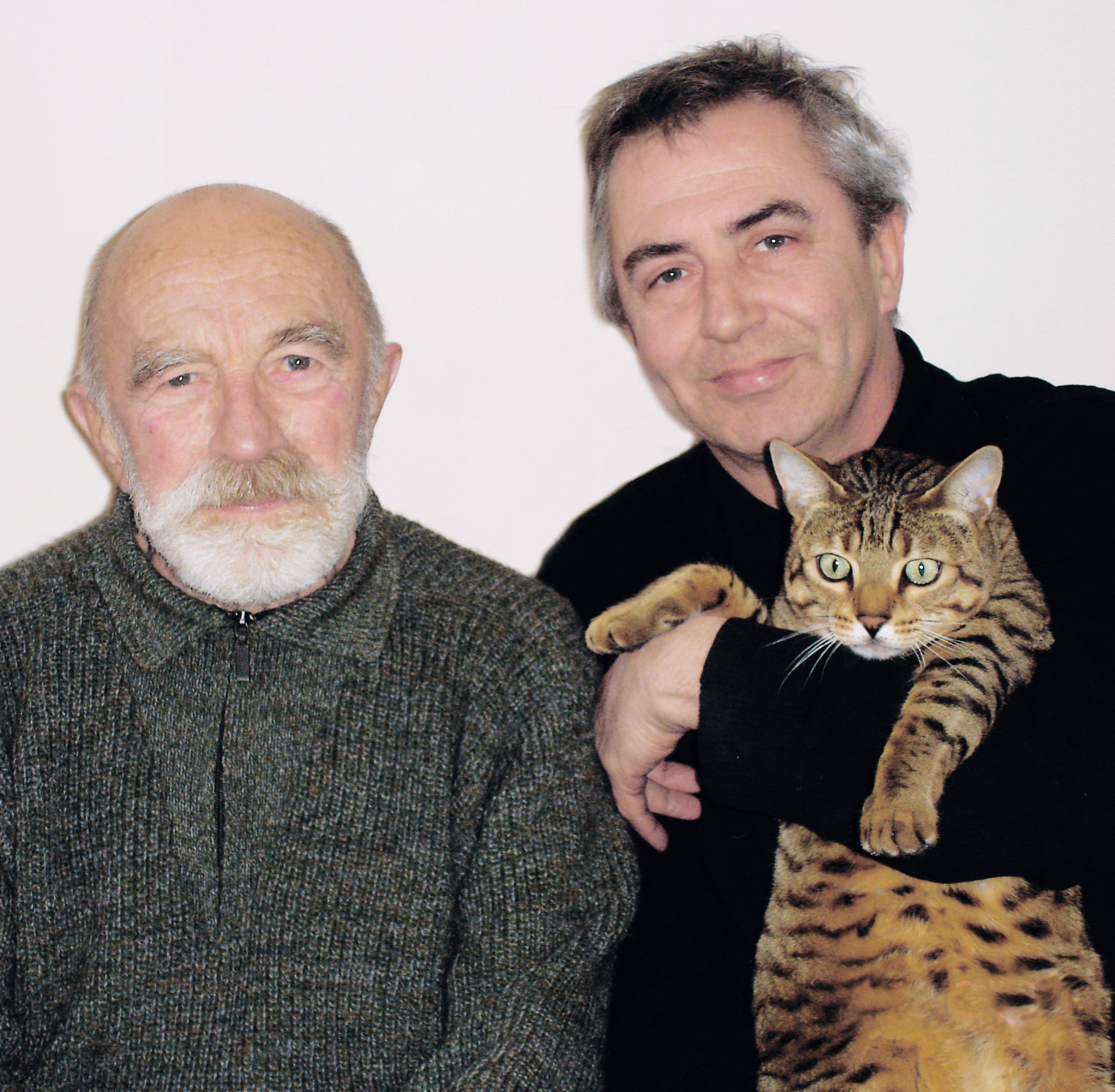
Bernard Parmegiani and Christian Zanési

Christian Zanési (born 22 May 1952) is a French composer.

== Biography ==
Born in Lourdes, Zanési studied with Guy Maneveau and Marie-Françoise Lacaze at the Pau University (South of France) (1974–1975), and with Pierre Schaeffer and Guy Reibel at the Paris Conservatory (1976–1977).

In 1977 he joined the Groupe de Recherches Musicales (GRM). There, he learned and practised all the technical skills linked to sound, thanks to a wide range of experiences, productions and encounters.

He has initiated many projects in the field of radio, publications and musical events including: the Electromania radio show on France Musique, the festival Présences électronique and the CD box sets Archives GRM, Bernard Parmegiani, l’œuvre musicale, Luc Ferrari, l’œuvre électronique.

He currently is the artistic director of the Ina GRM.

Since the 1990s Christian Zanési has been composing from his home studio and drawing his inspiration from the poetic encounter with remarkable sounds.

In 2011, Christian Zanési took part in Jérémie Carboni's Musique(s) électronique(s) documentary on Electronic music.

== Discography ==
- D'un jardin à l'autre (extrait)—Concert Imaginaire Ina C1000
- Stop! l'horizon/ Profil-Désir/—Courir INA C 2001
- Grand Bruit—Métamkine MKC 011
- Arkheion (Les mots de Stockhausen/ Les voix de Pierre Schaeffer)—INA E 5001 (Diapason d’or)
- Le paradoxe de la femme-poisson—INA K 198
- Contributions aux publications du C.M.G.—Koka Media M10 27 58 72
- Matin Brun—Radio France
- 91/98/01—InaGRM/La Muse en circuit
- GRM EXPERIENCE—with Mika Vainio (Pan Sonic) and Christian Fennesz Signature Radio France/ GRM
- Magnetic Landscape—Koka Media
- Soixante-dix huit tours—Double Entendre

=== Compilations ===
- Rough Trade Shops-Electronic 01 (2xCD, Comp)—Marseille—Mute Records Ltd
- Rough Trade Shops-Electronic 01 (12")—Marseille 2—Mute Records Ltd
- Concert Imaginaire-GRM—D'un Jardin à l'autre—INA-GRM
- Génériques Potentiels—Rebecca, Electro Jeu, ...—Cezame
- Klangwelten—Grand Bruit (Excerpt)—WERGO
- 50 Ans De Musique Electroacoustique au Groupe de Recherches (2xCD)—Grand Bruit, Saphir, S...—Fondazione Teatro Massimo
- Archives GRM (5xCD + Box)—Sonal RATP—INA-GRM
- The Citizen Band Issue. Vibrö No.3—Audio Visage—Vibrö
- Shepherds Know How to Have the Best Wool (File, MP3, Mixed, 192)—Nostalgia—Ante-Rasa
