= Robert Delbos =

French businessperson (born January 10, 1943)

- Born: 10 January 1943 (age 83); San Francisco, California, United States
- Education: MSc in Finance at HEC Paris (1967)
- Occupations: Co-Founder and CEO of Altergaz (2003-12) : €1,6bn in 2012

Robert Delbos (born January 10, 1943) is a French Chairman and CEO within the energy sector. He is known as co-founder and CEO of Altergaz, the first French independent natural gas company in 2003.

== Early life ==
In 1967 Delbos graduated in Finance from French business school HEC Paris (The École des Hautes Études Commerciales de Paris).

== Career ==
Delbos entered in EDF-GDF group in 1969 and worked in Treasury department before becoming Chief of Treasury in 1987. Delbos managed, in collaboration with Jean-Michel Carboni, his successor as Treasurer of the group, the "second biggest Swaps portfolio right after the World Bank" and "at that time, GDF was considered as pioneer in raising funds". In 1991 Chairman-CEO of Petrofigaz, a credit bank dedicated to loans for energy investments (cogeneration facilities, energy retrofit, etc.). Today Petrofigaz is known as Solfea bank.

== Altergaz ==
After retirement in 2003, he cofounded with Jean-Paul George (former number 2 of Gaz de France and founder of Engie Cofely) and the investor Georges Cohen (founder of Transiciel) the first French independent natural gas company : Altergaz, with a turnover of €1,6 billion in 2012. Delbos was CEO and then Chairman of Altergaz between 2003 and 2012.

After years of collaboration, Eni, the Italian multinational Oil & Gas company, acquired Altergaz, that was renamed Eni Gas & Power France with 1,5 million of customers in France.
