= Jean-Paul George =

French businessperson (born March 22, 1944)

- Born: March 22, 1944 (age 82)
- Education: École Polytechnique, CentraleSupélec
- Occupations: Co-Founder and Chairman of Altergaz (2003–12) : €1,6bn in 2012

Jean-Paul George (born March 22, 1944) is a French Chairman and CEO of the energy sector. He is known as co-founder and Chairman of Altergaz, the first French independent natural gas company, created in 2003.

== Early life ==
Jean-Paul George graduated from École Polytechnique (1964) and CentraleSupélec (1967-69).

== Career ==
Jean-Paul George entered in EDF-GDF group in the 70's, he was sales manager of Gaz de France and he is known as founder of the first Gaz de France's subsidiary: Cofathec, today renamed ENGIE Cofely (€2,2bn of turnover in 2018). He was CEO of Cofathec group from 1994 to 2000 before being appointed Delegate-General of Gaz de France's e-company.

== Altergaz ==
After retirement, he cofounded in 2003 with Robert Delbos (former Treasurer, CFO of EDF-GDF and CEO of Solfea bank) and the investor Georges Cohen (founder of Transiciel) the first French independent natural gas company : Altergaz (turnover in 2012 : €1,6 billion). Delbos was the CEO and George the Chairman of Altergaz between 2003 and 2012.

After years of collaboration, Eni, the Italian multinational Oil & Gas company, acquired Altergaz, that was renamed Eni Gas & Power France with 1,5 million of customers in France.

== Honours ==
George has been decorated with the National Order of the Legion of Honour.
