= Eni Gas & Power France =

Eni Gas & Power France S.A.
- Formerly: Altergaz S.A. (2003-2012)
- Company type: Public S.A.
- Traded as: Euronext Paris: MLALT
- ISIN: FR0010047928
- Industry: Energy
- Founded: December 16, 2003; 22 years ago
- Founder: Taoufik Tahar; Robert Delbos; Jean-Paul George
- Headquarters: Levallois-Perret, France
- Area served: France
- Key people: Taoufik Tahar (Co-founder); Robert Delbos (Co-founder & Chairman); Jean-Paul George (Co-founder & CEO)
- Products: Natural gas
- Revenue: 1,360,497,000 (2017)
- Net income: −30,772,900 (2017)
- Owner: Eni gas e luce (99.87%)
- Number of employees: 184 (2017)
- Parent: Eni
- Website: fr.eni.com

Eni Gas & Power France (formerly Altergaz) is the first French natural gas company. It is based in Paris and was founded by Taoufik Tahar, Robert Delbos and Jean-Paul George in 2003.

In 2012, Eni, the Italian Oil & Gas multinational acquired the company.

== History ==
Altergaz was initially founded in 2003 by Taoufik Tahar and two former senior executive of French energy sectors: Robert Delbos and Jean-Paul George. Taoufik Tahar was the founder and CEO of Easyloan first credit broker in France. Robert Delbos was Chief of Treasury and CFO of EDF-GDF (today EDF and Engie) and then Chairman-CEO of Petrofigaz (today Solfea bank). Jean-Paul George was the former number 2 of GDF (today Engie) as sales manager in the 90s and the founder-CEO of Cofathec group (today Engie Cofely).

In 2004, the investor Georges Cohen, founder of Transiciel company joined Altergaz as business angel and became associate.

In 2005, Altergaz was listed on Bourse de Paris stock exchange.

In 2012, the turnover of Altergaz was around €1,6 billion.

=== Partnership with Eni ===
From 2007, Altergaz created a strong industrial and financial partnership with the Italian oil and gas multinational Eni. From 2010, Eni is the first shareholder of Altergaz with more than 63% of the capital and in 2011 Eni got around 98% of shares.

=== Altergaz became Eni Gas & Power France ===
The October 1st 2012, Eni acquired Altergaz in full and was renamed Eni Gas & Power France.
