= International Computer Music Association =

International association of individuals involved in integrating music and technology

The International Computer Music Association (ICMA) is an international affiliation of individuals and institutions involved in the technical, creative, and performance aspects of computer music. It serves composers, engineers, researchers and musicians who are interested in the integration of music and technology. Areas of interest include artificial intelligence, music informatics, synthesis, analysis, digital signal processing, intermedia, multimedia, composition, human–computer interaction, representation, acoustics, aesthetics, education and history.

Each year the ICMA organises the International Computer Music Conference for computer music researchers and composers. The peer-reviewed conference includes concert performances, paper presentations, panel discussions, sound installations, poster presentations and other formats for presentation of research and creative activity. Each year, or every other year, its online journal ARRAY is published for its members, containing reviews, interviews and articles.

A diversity statement was adopted in June 2019.
