= Feltrinelli =

Feltrinelli may refer to:

- Feltrinelli (publisher) (Giangiacomo Feltrinelli Editore), Italian publishing house
- Giangiacomo Feltrinelli (1926–1972), founder of the publishing house
- Inge Feltrinelli (1930–2018), photographer and widow of Giangiacomo Feltrinelli. She and her son Carlo (b. 1962) are directors of the publishing house.
- Feltrinelli Prize (Premio Feltrinelli), awarded by the Accademia Nazionale dei Lincei since 1950 in various fields of arts, sciences and "exceptional endeavours of outstanding moral and humanitarian value".
- Antonio Feltrinelli (1887–1942), entrepreneur
