= The Scapegoat (2013 film) =

- Film poster
- French: Au bonheur des ogres
- Directed by: Nicolas Bary
- Written by: Jérôme Fansten; Serge Frydman; Nicolas Bary
- Based on: Au bonheur des ogres 1985 novel by Daniel Pennac
- Produced by: Dimitri Rassam; Jérôme Seydoux
- Starring: Raphaël Personnaz; Bérénice Bejo
- Cinematography: Patrick Duroux
- Edited by: Véronique Lange
- Music by: Rolfe Kent
- Production companies: Pathé; Chapter 2; France 2 Cinema; Bidibul Productions; Nexus Factory
- Distributed by: Pathé Distribution
- Release date: 16 October 2013
- Running time: 92 minutes
- Country: France
- Language: French
- Budget: $14 million
- Box office: $1.5 million

The Scapegoat (French: Au bonheur des ogres) is a 2013 French comedy film directed by Nicolas Bary.

== Plot summary ==
As attention-grabbing and controversial incidents take place wherever Benjamin Malaussene goes, the cops and his colleagues suspect him. He is then determined to find out who is harassing him.

== Cast ==
- Raphaël Personnaz as Benjamin Malaussène
- Bérénice Bejo as Aunt Julia
- Guillaume de Tonquédec as Sainclair
- Emir Kusturica as Stojil
- Thierry Neuvic as Inspector Carrega
- Mélanie Bernier as Louna
- Alice Pol as The child psychiatrist
- Youssef Hajdi as Amar
- Marie-Christine Adam as Miss Hamilton
- Julia Piaton as The journalist
- Isabelle de Hertogh as The dissatisfied customer
