= Marc Battier =

French composer and musicologist

Marc Battier (born 21 December 1947) is a French composer and musicologist.

Marc Battier, born on December 21, 1947, in Brive-La Gaillarde, is a French professor and composer. He was a member of Ircam (1979-2002), associate professor at the Sorbonne (1997-2002), and then a university professor in musicology at Sorbonne University. He has also been a visiting professor at the University of California, San Diego (1984-1986), the Aichi University of Arts and Music (Japan, 2018), and a distinguished professor at Shenzhen University (China, 2019-2024). Besides his work as a teacher and musicologist, he has worked at the GRM (Groupe de recherches musicales, Paris), Ircam (Centre Pompidou), the Museum of Music (Cité de la musique, Paris, now Philharmonie), and other international institutions. Having started using computers for composing as early as 1970, he has contributed to the international development of the field, especially in France, the United States, China, and Japan. He is a composer of instrumental and electroacoustic music, published by Babelscores in Paris

== Musicology ==
After some short studies of architecture at the École nationale supérieure des Beaux-Arts in Paris, Battier chose to focus on electroacoustic and contemporary music. He received his PhD in 1981 at the University of Paris X Nanterre in aesthetics. In 1997, he passed the Habilitation à diriger des recherches in musicology, a higher education diploma requested to become a university professor and be an adviser of doctoral candidates in France.

He cofounded the Electroacoustic Music Studies (EMS) conference with Leigh Landy in 2003 and the Electroacoustic Music Studies Network with Leigh Landy and Daniel Teruggi in 2005.

He founded in 2007 and is the current president of the Electroacoustic Music Studies Asia Network association (EMSAN).

== Career ==
In 1997, Battier was hired by Sorbonne University (then Université Paris IV) to become associate professor. This was a part-time position with full professor privileges, such as advising doctoral students. In 2002, he became full professor, and had to quit working at IRCAM. He stayed at Sorbonne University until his retirement, in 2026, when he became emeritus professor. In 2015, he became a full member of the newly created Institut de recherches en musicology (iReMus), a CNRS-led UMR (Unité mixte de recherches). Battier has been invited to teach in various universities: at Paris 8 University as a lecturer for many years, the University of California, San Diego, from 1984 to 1986, the Université de Montréal (2008), the University of California, Irvine (2009), and the Aichi Prefectural University of Fine Arts and Music (Japan, 2009, and 2018). Assistant to John Cage (Paris, 1970).

He was hired by IRCAM from 1979 to 2002 as a teacher, musical assistant and executive. There, he worked as musical assistant with many prominent composers: Steve Reich, Pierre Henry, Pierre Boulez, Karlheinz Stockhausen (for "Kathinka's Gesang"), Joji Yuasa (for Nine Levels by Ze-Ami), Philippe Manoury (for Jupiter).

He has composed electroacoustic music since 1970 and started to use computers for composition (1970), for control of analogue EMS VCS3 synthesizers (1973), and for sound synthesis (MUSIC V: Geométrie d'Hiver, 1978). He has written many pieces for electroacoustic sounds, processed voices and electronic sounds often mixed with live instruments.

In 2013, he became "Electroacoustic Music Master" at the Beijing DeTao Masters Academy, a creativity-oriented Institute of higher education located at the Shanghai Institute of Visual Art in Shanghai and, in 2015, he was selected to be a Supervisor for doctoral dissertations at the Planetary Collegium, DeTao branch, Shanghai.

Since 2014, he is a Global Associate of the New Music World organization in New York. In 2015, New York University asked him to give private composition lessons in music technology at NYU Paris. Also in 2015, he started a collaboration with Suzhou Academy of Music (China) to develop an electroacoustic music graduate program. Along the same lines, he received in 2027 the title of Expert of 1000 Talents of China, an award which comes with several privileges. He then began a collaboration with Shenzhen University, which lasted until 2024.

In 2017, hired by New York University, New York, to give a computer music workshop with prof. Taehong park, August. From April to August 2018, he taught the Aichi University of the Arts, Nagakute (Japan).

He has published several CDs: Transparence (CD BOND AGE BRCD 9595), released in 1995, received these comments from Larry Wendt in Computer Music Journal:

Possibilities of work between sound poets and musicians have recently been reexamined, however, in a new collaborative CD titled Transparence. This is a collection of acoustical landscapes by composer Marc Battier. The sounds used in the compositions have all been rendered from a single fragment of a sound poem by Henri Chopin. ... As it is essentially stated in the liner notes, Marc Battier's works are translations of Henri Chopin's sound poetry into music. ... Marc Battier has translated Henri Chopin's studies of condensed temporal motion into lush spatial landscapes evocative of multiple horizons in Japan's composed and natural countryside. ... Marc Battier has maintained a high degree of symmetry and resonance with Henri Chopin's ideological sources in Transparence, and has extended a way of working into more non-obvious realms of investigation.

His piece for brass quintet and 4-channel tape, an IRCAM commission, was performed at the 1984 Paris ICMC. Hubert Howe wrote about it that it was a "subtle and successful piece" (Perspectives of New Music 1985).

== Prizes and commissions ==
- 2016, China national plan "1000 Talents", Expert category
- 2014, DeTao Master Professor Marc Battier received an award for Outstanding Contribution to Musicacoustica-Beijing on October 26, 2014, Beijing (China).
- 1984–1985, winner, "Villa Medicis hors les murs", ministry of Foreign Affairs, one-year stay in California.
- Commissions from French National Centre for Scientific Research, 1978, Japan (1981, 1993, 2012), Bourges Festival of experimental music (1983), IRCAM (1984), Massachusetts Arts Council (USA) (1985), French State (Commande d'Etat), 1989, China (2006, 2009, 2010, 2011), Groupe de recherches musicales, INA-GRM (2008, 2012), DAAD for Technische Universität Berlin, Northeastern University (2012), Salamanca Electroacoustic Music Festival, Gifu, Japan (2015).

== Affiliations ==
- Société asiatique
- Société des Études Japonaises
- Réseau Asie, CNRS
- Collège de ’Pataphysique

He is on the board of:

- Organised Sound (Cambridge University Press)
- Malaysian Music Journal (Faculty of Music and Performing Arts, Sultan Idris Education University, Malaysia)
- International Journal of Sound, Music and Technology (IJSMT, Taiwan)
- Leonardo (2012–), honorary editor
- Leonardo Music Journal (1992–2011, MIT Press)
- Computer Music Journal (1980–1996, MIT Press)

== Recent publications ==
- Esthétique du son artificiel. Genèse des musiques électroniques, Paris: Éditions philosophiques Vrin , 2024. ISBN 978-2-7116-3168-1.
- Computer Music in the 21st Century – History and Practice (21世纪计算机音乐创作：历史与实践), Guangzhou: Sun Ya-Tsen/Zhongshan University Press, 2023, 360 p. ISBN 978-7-306-07863-6. Monographie bilingue anglais-chinois.
- "Crossing Lines: Stylistic gradients in Chinese electroacoustic music", Organised Sound 27(3), 2023, 284-293.
- "The Computer Music Lab at Shenzhen University", Proceedings of the International Computer Music Association, San Francisco, ICMC 2023, Shenzhen, China, 4p.
- "François Bayle ou la poésie du sonore", in Musique et recherche interdisciplinaire en Sorbonne avec Danièle Pistone, sous la direction de François Madurell et Jean-Pierre Bartoli, Lyon, Symétrie, 2022, p. 113-120
- "Analysing Electronic Music. Uncovering the Original Conditions of Production", in Teaching Electronic Music. Cultural, Creative, and Analytical Perspectives, sous la direction de Blake Stevens, London, Routledge, 2021, p. 58-74.
- "Nuo Ri Lang by Zhang Xiaofu", in Between the Tracks. Musicians on Selected Electronic Music, sous la direction de Kerry Hagan et Miller Puckette, Cambridge (MA), The MIT Press, 2020, p. 174-193.
- Electroacoustic Music in East Asia, sous la direction de Marc Battier et Kenneth Fields, London, Routledge, 2020.
- "Building Bridges; Nourishing the Soul -- Ten Years of Musical Activities in China", in Musicking the Soul, sous la dir. de Zhang Boyu et Kimasi Browne, Pékin, Central Conservatory of Music Press, 2018, p. 86-97. Version chinoise de l'ouvrage: "Da zao gou tong qiao liang, han yang yin yue ling hun zai zhong guo de shi nian yin yue li cheng" (打造沟通桥梁，涵养音乐灵魂在中国的十年音乐历程 Building a bridge of communication and nurturing the music soul in China's ten-year music history), dans Hun zhi yue shi ——yin yue xue shu jiao liu ji shi lu (魂之乐事——音乐学术交流纪实录 The Music of souls - A Documentary of Music Academic Exchange), sous la dir. de Zhang Boyu, Pékin, Central Conservatory of Music Press, 2018, p. 79-88.
- Instruments électriques, électroniques et virtuels, responsables Marc Battier, Alban Framboisier et Florence Gétreau, Musique • Images • Instruments n°17, Paris, CNRS éditi
- "Electronic Music in East Asia" (Marc Battier and Lin-Ni Liao), The Routledge Research Companion to Electronic Music: Reaching out with Technology, sous la dir. de Simon Emmerson, London, Routledge, 2018, p. 49-76.
- "Studying Japanese Electroacoustic Music: A View from Paris 日本の電子音響音楽研究――パリからの視点", Mixed Muses n°12, Aichi University of the Arts, 2017, p. 13-23.
- "La musique mixte comme extension de l'interculturalité", dans Regards sur les musiques mixtes, textes réunis par Marc Battier, Paris, Institut national de l'audiovisuel, 2016, p.105-116.
- "Musicacoustica-Beijing 2016 from a Perspective of a French Composer - An Interview with Marc Battier", Pékin, Music & Technology 02, 2016, p. 26-29 (in Chinese).
- "Les gradients stylistiques dans les contacts entre musiques occidentale et extrême-orientale", dans Extrême-Orient et Occident, sous la dir. de J.-J. Velly et Liao Hui-Chen, Paris, L'Harmattan 2016, p. 169-175.
- "Recent Discoveries in the Spatial Thought of Early Musique concrète », in Kompositionen für hörbaren Raum. Dir frühe Elektroakustiche Musik und ihre Kontexte. Compositions for Audible Space. The Early Electroacoustic Music and its Contexts, sous la dir. de Marthan Brech et Ralph Paland, Bielefeld (Allemagne), transcript Verlag, 2015, p.123-136.
- "Describe, transcribe, notate: Prospects and problems facing electroacoustic music", Organised Sound vol. 20 n. 1, Special issue: Organised sound celebrates 20 years, 2015, 60-67.
- "Écrire de la musique mixte pour instruments traditionnels de Chine et du Japon : shakuhachi, pipa, guqin", dans Fusion du temps. Passé-Présent, Extrême Orient - Extrême Occident, sous la dir. de Lin-Ni Liao et Marc Battier, Paris, Delatour-France, 2014, p. 109-119.
- Pierre Barbaud. Correspondance, Battier, M., L. Claass et N. Viel (dir.), Paris, Delatour, 2011.
- Entries for The Grove Dictionary of American Music, 2nd edition, New York, Oxford University Press, 2011.
- "Messiaen and his collaborative musique concrète rhythmic study"', in Olivier Messiaen : the Centenary Papers, sous la dir. de Judith Crispin, Newcastle upon Tyne, Cambridge Scholars Publishing, 2010, p. 1–27
- "Phonography and Invention of Sound", in Philosophical Reflections on Recorded Music, Mine Dogatan-Dack, ed., London, Middlesex University Press, 2008, p. 99–115
- Musique et informatique, une bibliographie indexée, Paris, Elmeratto, CNRS, 1978. Review at Bibliothèque nationale de France.

== Recent works ==
- La coupe de jade verte · La nuit du Festival des lanternes, commissioned by Zhang Weiliang for Les flûtes du Monde, for 2 bamboo flutes (xiao and dizi)m harp and cello, Salle Cortot Paris, January 31st, 2027.
- Concertino for Vibraphone and String Orchestra, commissioned by he 6th 2024 PUENTE Festival Interoceánico: Encuentro interoceánico de culturas, performed by Orquesta Marga Marga, cond. Luis Jose Recart, October 16, 2024, Valparaiso (Chile), Thierry Miroglio, soloist.
- Rustle and Shimmer, for percussion and Chinese flutes, commissioned by MUSICACOUSTICA festival, Beijing
- Recollections, for orchestra and tape, Commission of the Second Asia-Europe Festival and the 34th Asian Composers League Festival & Conference, Hanoi, Vietnam, 2016 (Vietnam National Symphony Orchestra, Honna Tetsuji, conductor). Of Recollections, Andrián Pertout wrote: "Highlights of the concert included Marc Battier's (France) Recollections for orchestra – a stunningly beautiful gestural work with an electroacoustic component that delicately layered the orchestra with a collection of subtle overtones".
- Proxima, for vibraphone, percussions and electroacoustic sounds, Commission of the Musicacoustica Festival, Beijing, China, 2016. Thierry Miroglio, perc.
- Rainwater, for orchestra, Commission of Azusa Pacific University Symphony Orchestra, Azusa (California), 2014 (Christopher Russell, conductor).
- 7 metamorphoses, percussion, poet and electroacoustic sounds on 8 channels, 26 minutes, INA-GRM commission, Paris, Maison de radio France, May 11, 2013. Poet: Zeno Bianu. Percussions: Thierry Miroglio. Beijing version, October 2013: 4 metamorphoses
- Constellations for guzheng, guzheng and electroacoustic sounds, Liu Jing, guzheng, CCOM Concert Hall, Beijing, October 2012.
- Constellations for koto, koto and electroacoustic sounds, Naoko Kikuchi, koto, St. Elisabeth-Kirche; "Nacht Klang" concert, Berlin, August 2012.
- I Gysin, for pipa and electronic sounds, written for Min Xiao Fen, Boston, September 2012..
- Constellation Sketches, for koto (13 strings) and electroacoustic sounds, Yoko Nomura, koto, Kaze no Hall, Nagakute, Japan, July 2012.
- Dans l'Atelier du Peintre, 8-channel tape, commission of DAAD for Technische Universität Berlin, January 2012, Berlin.
- Double suns, for violin and electronic sounds, written for Mari Kimura, Beijing, 2011.
- Conversaciones, for guqin, poet, laptop and electronic sounds (Musicacoustica festival, Beijing, 2010)
- Mist on a Hill, for pipa and electronic sounds (Musicacoustica festival, Beijing, 2009); on Mist on Hill, see: Hong-Da 2017
- Audioscans, on nine paintings by Roberto Matta, CD and booklet, foreword by Jean-Yves Bosseur, original poems by Zéno Bianu, MAAT 011, 2009.
- Bird of the capital (Miyako dori), for shakuhachi, voice and processed voice, (INA-GRM commission, Paris, 2008).
