= ENGIE IT =

Engie Information & Technologies (Engie IT)
- Type: Subsidiary of Engie group
- Industry: IT services for French electricity and gas companies
- Founder: Jean-Michel Carboni
- Headquarters: Paris, France
- Key people: Jean-Michel Carboni (Founder-CEO: 2010-15)
- Services: Management of Information and Technologies - Engie group
- Revenue: €657 million (2024)
- Parent: Engie : €78,3 billion (2024)

Engie IT or Engie Information & Technologies (former GDF Suez IT) is the IT subsidiary of Engie energy group launched in 2010 by senior executive Jean-Michel Carboni. Engie IT's revenue in 2013 amounted to €600 million.

== History ==
Historically each department, subsidiary or branch of Gaz de France group had their own IT service department. After the merger of Gaz de France and Suez in 2008, the strategy was to pool all IT services of the two energy groups (and also Suez Environnement group) and in 2010 President Gérard Mestrallet commissioned senior executive Jean-Michel Carboni in charge of DSI to launch the mutualization process.

In 2010, Carboni founded and became CEO of Engie IT (at that time named GDF Suez IT). In 2013, Engie IT's revenue amounted to €600M.

In March 2015 Olivier Sala, former director of GEG (Gaz Electricité de Grenoble), was appointed CEO of Engie IT (still GDF Suez IT at that time). In June 2015, the transformation plan "We Motion" was launched, in order to improve Engie IT’s operational efficiency.

The infrastructure masterplan, ambitious program whose implementation was managed by Engie IT, faced many difficulties. The outlines of the program were redefined by early 2016. In the context of its transformation plan, Engie IT set up a new organization focusing on services in September 2016.

In 2020, Engie IT's CEO Mathieu Pestel reports a that Engie IT decided in association with DXC Technology and ServiceNow to launch a certified worldwide excellence centre, in order to simplify and modernize the employee experience and to encourage innovation.

In 2023, ENGIE IT appointed a new CEO Roland Zain as of July 1.

== Activities ==
ENGIE IT includes four "families" of services :

- Digital and IT Consulting
- Digital Workplace
- Cloud Infrastructures
- Network and Cybersecurity
- Agile business solutions
- Common Applications

== Key Figures ==
- Revenues : 2013 = €600M; 2015 = €442M.
- Operation of 110,000 mailboxes
- 50,000 Skynote workstations deployed in 2020
- 2,700 employees
