= Daniel Pennac =

French writer (born 1944)

Daniel Pennacchioni
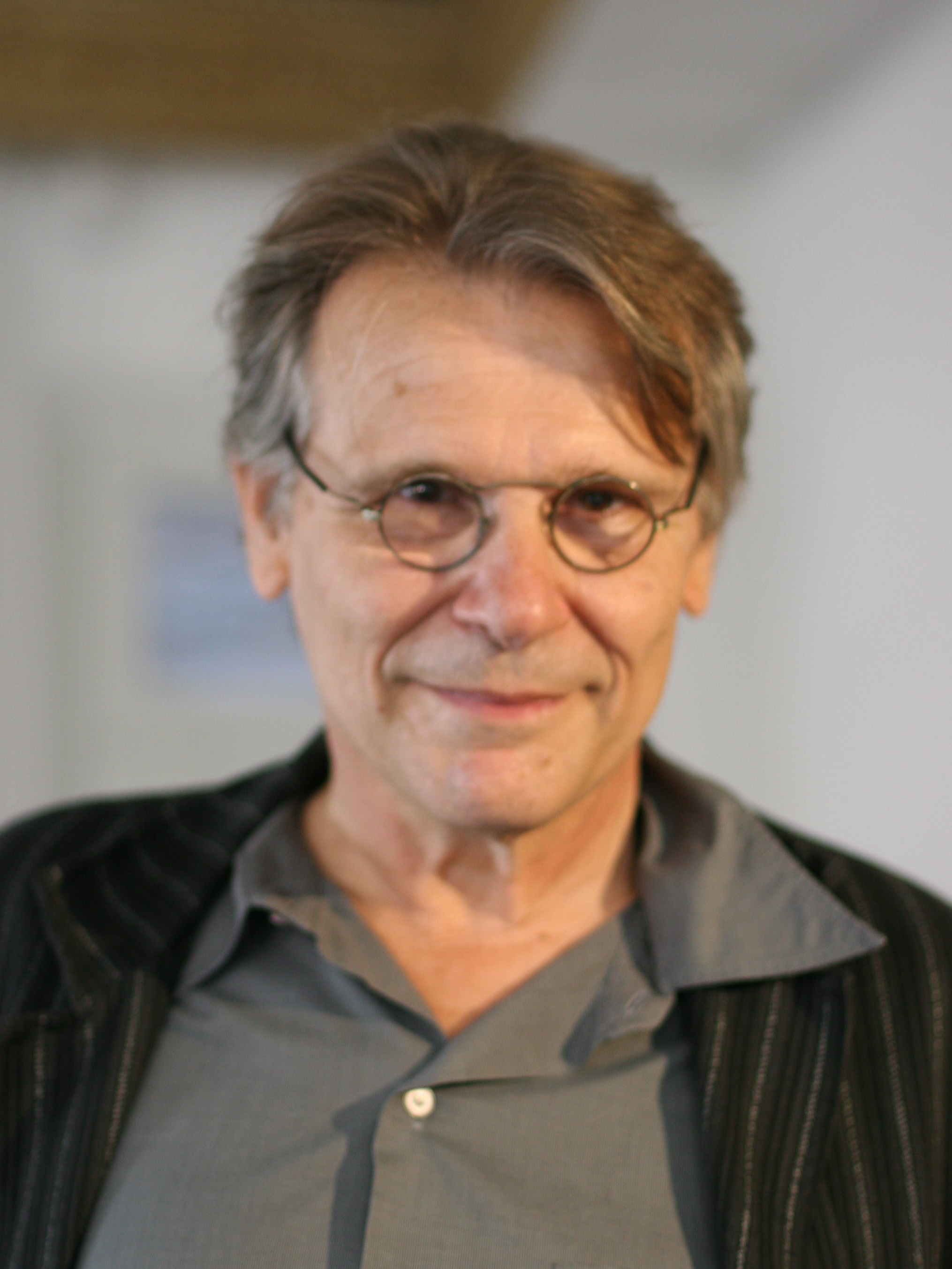
- Born: Daniel Pennacchioni; 1 December 1944 (age 81); Casablanca, French Morocco
- Occupation: Novelist
- Writing career
- Notable awards: Prix Renaudot 2007

Daniel Pennac (real name Daniel Pennacchioni, born 1 December 1944 in Casablanca, French Morocco) is a French writer. He received the Prix Renaudot in 2007 for his essay Chagrin d'école.

== Biography ==
=== Family and education ===
Daniel Pennacchioni is the fourth and last son of a Corsican and Provençal family. His father was a polytechnicien who became an officer of the colonial army, reaching the rank of general at retirement and his mother, a housewife, was a self-taught reader. His childhood was spent wherever his father was stationed, in Africa (Djibouti, Ethiopia, Algeria, Equatorial Africa), Southeast Asia (Indochina) and France (including La Colle-sur-Loup). His father's love for poetry gave him a taste for books that he quickly devoured in the family library or at school

=== Career ===
After spending his childhood traveling around the world between Africa, Europe, and Asia, he studied in Nice and then settled permanently in Paris and started working as a teacher. He began to write for children, including his series "La Saga Malaussène", which tells the story of Benjamin Malaussène, a scapegoat, and his family in Belleville, Paris. In a 1997 piece for Le Monde, Pennac stated that Malaussène's youngest brother, Le Petit, was the son of Jerome Charyn's New York detective, Isaac Sidel.

As a writer, he developed a style. His comic stories were in the contradictions of our time. He achieved success with the Belleville series, novels published in Italy by Feltrinelli between 1991 and 1995.

His writing style can be humorous and imaginative as in "La Saga Malaussène", or scholarly, as exemplified by the essay "Comme un roman." His comic Débauche, written jointly with Jacques Tardi, deals with unemployment.

=== Literary awards ===
In 1990 Pennac won the "Prix du Livre Inter" for La petite marchande de prose. His 1984 novel L'œil du loup was translated into English as Eye of the Wolf by Sarah Adams – later known as Sarah Ardizzone – and published by Walker Books in 2002; Adams won the biennial British Marsh Award for Children's Literature in Translation in 2005 for that work. In 2002 he won the Grinzane Cavour Prize. In 2007 Pennac won the Prix Renaudot for Chagrin d'école. He won the "Grand Prix Metropolis bleu" in 2008 for his complete work. In 2013 he received an honorary degree in pedagogy from the University of Bologna.

In 2023 Pennac was the recipient of the Raymond Chandler Award.

== Bibliography ==
=== Autobiography ===
- Chagrin d'école Gallimard (2007), ISBN 978-2-07-076917-9
  - School Blues Translator Sarah Ardizzone (née Adams), Quercus (2011), ISBN 978-1-906694-64-7
  - Schoolpijn Translator Kiki Coumans, Boekerij, De (2010), ISBN 978-90-290-8602-8
  - Skolas sāpes Translator Agnese Kasparova, Omnia Mea (2012), ISBN 978-9984-9926-9-3

=== Novels for children ===
- Cabot-Caboche (1982); Translated into English as Dog, Translator Sarah Adams, Illustrator Britta Teckentrup, Candlewick (2004)
- L'œil du loup (Eye of the wolf) (1984); Translator Sarah Adams, Illustrator Max Grafe, Walker (2002), ISBN 9780744590104, OCLC 249228612; Illustrator Catherine Reisser, Pocket (1994), ISBN 9782266126304
- Kamo: L'agence Babel (1992)
- L'Évasion de Kamo
- Kamo et moi
- Kamo : L'idée du siècle

=== Other novels ===
- Père Noël (1979), with Tudor Eliad (Grasset et Fasquelle)
- Messieurs les enfants (1997)
- Le Dictateur et le hamac (2003)
  - English The dictator and the hammock, Random House UK, 2006, ISBN 9781843431893
  - Dutch De dictator en de hangmat, Meulenhof, 2005, ISBN 90-290-7468-X, Translator Truus Boot
- Merci (2004), he has interpreted it himself at the theatre

La Saga Malaussène

- Au bonheur des ogres (1985)
  - The Scapegoat, Translator Ian Monk, Harvill Press, 1998, ISBN 978-1-86046-442-3
  - Adapted by other writers into the 2013 film The Scapegoat (French: Au bonheur des ogres)
- La fée carabine (1987)
  - The fairy gunmother, Translator Ian Monk, Harvill Press, 1997, ISBN 978-1-86046-325-9
- La petite marchande de prose (1989)
  - Write to Kill, Translator Ian Monk, Harvill, 1999, ISBN 978-1-86046-535-2
- Monsieur Malaussène (1995)
  - Monsieur Malaussène, Translator Ian Monk, Harvill, 2003
- Monsieur Malaussène au théâtre (1996)
- Des Chrétiens et des maures (1996)
- Aux fruits de la passion (1999)
  - Passion Fruit, Harvill, 2001, ISBN 978-1-86046-747-9

=== Essays ===
- Le service militaire au service de qui ?, (1973) published under his real name Daniel Pennacchioni
- Comme un roman, Gallimard, 1992, ISBN 978-2-07-072580-9
  - Reads like a novel, Quartet Books, 1994, ISBN 978-0-7043-7073-9
  - The Rights of the Reader, Translator Sarah Adams, Illustrator Quentin Blake, Candlewick Press, 2008, ISBN 978-0-7636-3801-6
  - Como una novela. Translated by Moisés Melo. Editorial Norma. 2006. ISBN 978-958-04-9492-8.

=== Illustrated books ===
- Les grandes vacances, (photographies) Pennac and Robert Doisneau (2002)
- La vie de famille
- Le sens de la Houppelande
- Vercors d'en haut: La réserve naturelle des hauts-plateaux
- Le grand Rex (1980)
- Némo
- Écrire

=== Illustrated books for children ===
- Sahara
- Le Tour du ciel, with the painting from Miró
- Qu'est-ce que tu attends, Marie ?, with the painting from Monet.

=== Comic books ===
- La débauche (illustrated by Tardi)
- Tête de nègre

=== Film and TV series ===
- Série noire (1984), season 1 episode 30
- Messieurs les enfants (1997)
- L'oeil du loup (1998)
- Monsieur Malaussène (2001)
- Ernest & Celestine (French: Ernest et Célestine) (2012)
- Daniel Pennac: Ho visto Maradona! (2022)

=== Films on Daniel Pennac ===
- Daniel Pennac, écrire, enseigner, communiquer directed by Stéphan Bureau (Canada/2009).
- Daniel Pennac, la Métamorphose du crabe directed by Charles Castella for the French collection documentary Empreintes of France 5 (Docside/2009).
- Bartleby en coulisses directed by Jérémie Carboni (France Télévisions Distribution/2010).
