= Stone washing =

Technique used on apparel for after wash effects

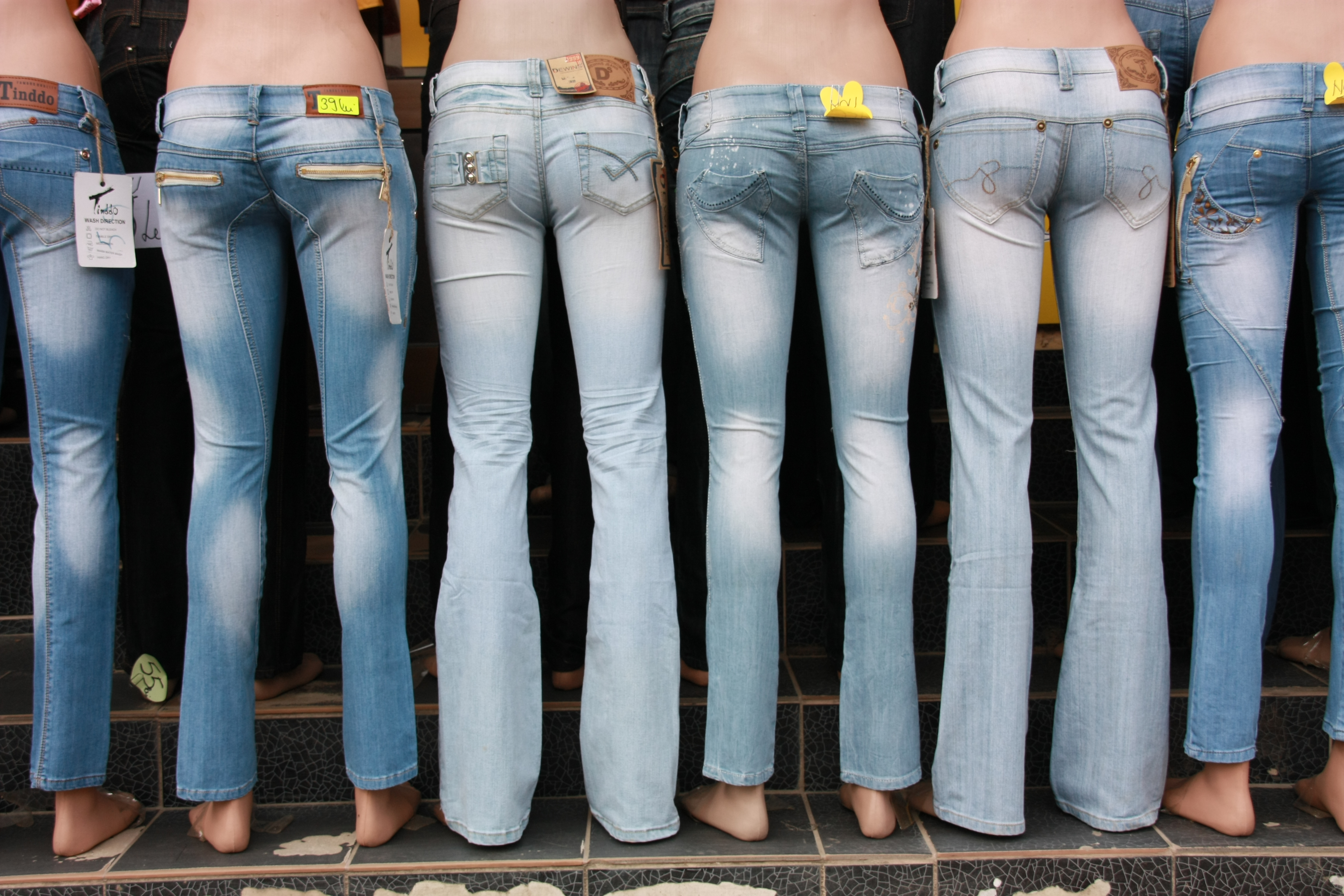
Stone-washed jeans

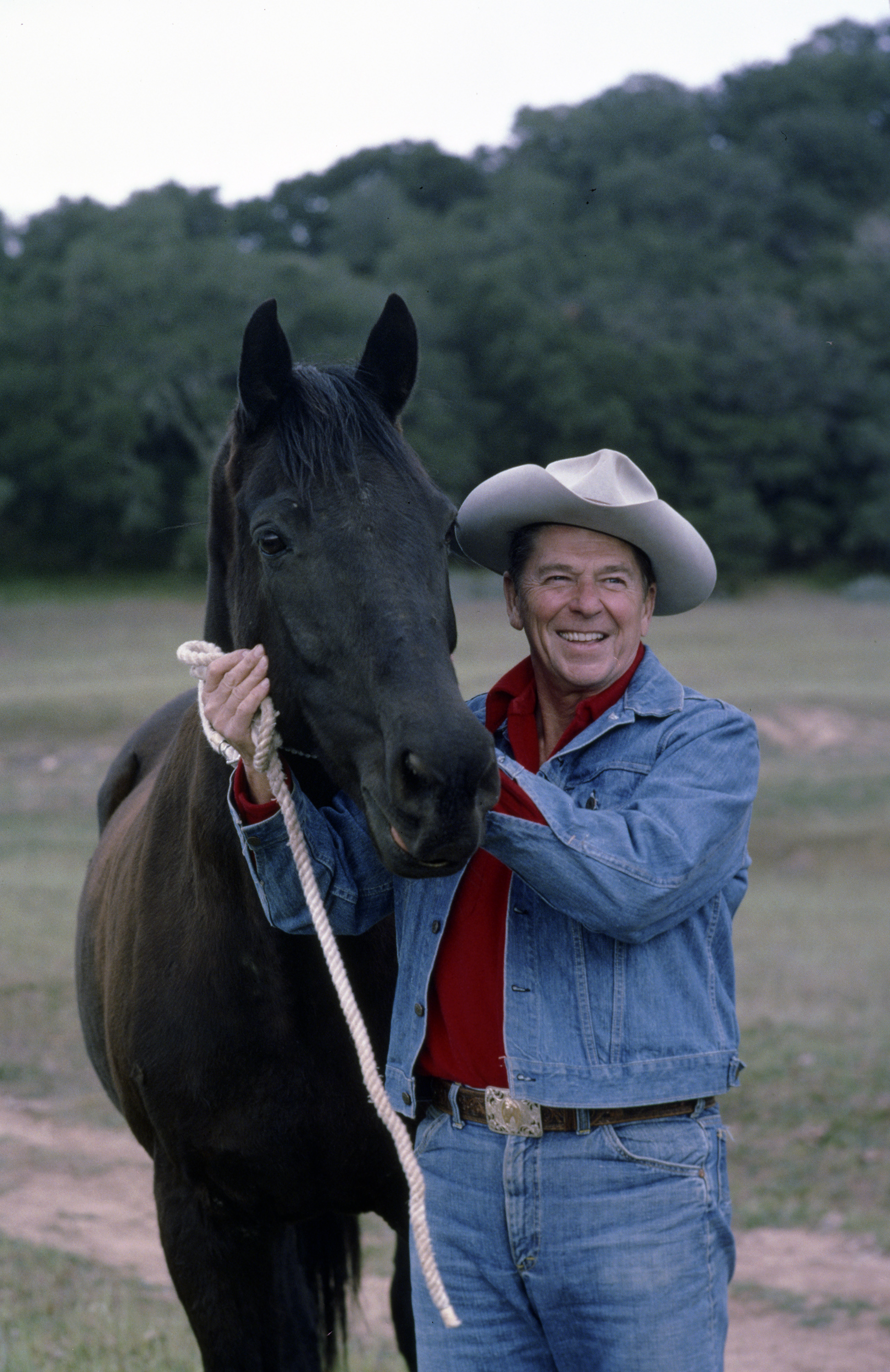
Ronald Reagan wearing stonewash denim associated with Western clothing, 1970s

Stone washing is a pile finishing process used in textile manufacturing, used to give a newly manufactured cloth garment a worn appearance. The process became popular in the 1980s, as acid jeans gained popularity; however, stone washing has roots going back to 1960s surfer apparel. Stone washing also helps to increase the softness and flexibility of otherwise stiff and rigid fabrics such as canvas and denim. Although stone washing increases a fabric's flexibility, it shortens the lifespan of the jeans. The process of stone washing can be costly, as freshly stone-washed jeans must be washed many times in order to remove the grit from the process. Along with high production costs, stone washing can be detrimental to the environment due to the excess grit that is removed as fabric is being stone washed. This leads many manufacturers to pursue other methods to achieve a distressed appearance.

The process uses large stones to roughen up the fabric being processed. The garments are placed in a large horizontal industrial clothes washer that is also filled with large stones. As the wash cylinder rotates, the cloth fibers are repeatedly pounded and beaten as the tumbling stones ride up the paddles inside the drum and fall back down onto the fabric. The frequency of tumble washes impacts the fabrics strength and rubbing fastness. As the fabric is washed in a washer repeatedly, the rubbing speed increases, and the strength of the fabric decreases. Longer wash times, coupled with frequent wash cycles, heightens the distressed look that stone washing aims to provide.

A number of people and organizations have claimed to have invented stone washing. According to Levi Strauss & Co., Donald Freeland, an employee of the Great Western Garment Company (later acquired by Levi's), invented "stone-washing" denim in the 1950s. Inventor Claude Blankiet has also been credited with having invented the technique in the 1970s. The jeans company Edwin claims to have invented the technique in the 1980s. It is commonly accepted that French stylists Marithé + François Girbaud are inventors of industrialization of stone washing ("Stonewash" technique). However, the process of stone washing was patented by jean company Rifle Jeans Company in 1986.

== Stonewashed jeans ==
Stonewashed jeans are jeans that have been treated to produce a faded, worn appearance. This is usually accomplished either by washing the jeans with pumice in a rotating drum, or by using chemicals to create the appearance without the use of a rotating drum. Pumice stones act like sandpaper on jeans, removing some of the dyes present. The expanding cost of importing pumice stone from Italy, Greece and Turkey led to extensive mining of pumice deposits in California, Arizona, and New Mexico, triggering a negative response from American ecologist groups. The reduction of pumice usage and the growing disposal of its chemically-tainted residue triggered a search for novel methods, notably the use of alternative abrading materials or machines and the use of cellulase enzymes. Pumice stones also encountered a shortage, as the popularity of the stones increased, leading to other stone washing methods being invented. The use of pumice stones also made the stone washing process harder to control, contributing to the method's decline. Too much of this pumice stone could damage the buttons or waistbands on jeans. Stonewashed jeans were a popular 1970s fashion trend, before commercial acid wash denim (discussed below) was introduced in the 1980s. In the 2000s, stonewashed jeans were heavily distressed, with pre-made holes, frayed edges and extensive fading caused by sandblasting.

Claude Blankiet with American Garment Finishers from Texas promoted the use of cellulase enzymes in the finishing industry. The use of cellulase enzymes to modify the appearance of jeans is commonly referred to as "biostoning." Cellulase was already used in the paper pulp, food processing industry and currently in the fermentation of biomass for biofuel production. Cellulase is produced primarily by fungi, bacteria and protozoans that catalyze the hydrolysis of cellulose. Various fungi have varying effects on the look of the denim that is being modified. Since the enzyme decomposes cellulose fibers this enhanced the characteristic appearance that the jeans have been abraded with stones (and eliminated or considerably reduced the usage of natural pumice stones). The use of biostoning allows for the selective loosening of dye particles from jeans. Buttons and other seams are less likely to be affected when biostoning is at play. Selecting the most suitable type of enzyme and their application for ageing jeans was the key to success. Along with the type of enzyme, the temperature at which the biostoning process occurs is also important. If temperatures are too low, the process proves to be less efficient. Similarly, if the biostoning process occurs in temperatures that are too warm, the denim can appear to be too faded. American Garment Finishers used a new cellulolytic agent patented in 1991 by Novo Nordisk from Denmark because of its safer effect on cotton fiber. Other finishers used an acid side Trichoderma fungi enzyme, cheaper and faster acting, but resulting in excessive fabric tear and a back lash because jeans pockets were lifting off. The cellulase enzyme that is used to biostone jeans was isolated from the fungi, Trichoderma reesei.

== Acid-washed jeans ==
=== Early examples ===
Acid-washed denim is washed with pumice stones and chlorine until it is bleached almost white. California surfers and members of the 1960s counterculture prized Levi 501s and other jeans that had been bleached by the salt water due to their authentic, "lived in" appearance. As natural wear took weeks, or even months, it was not uncommon to hang a few new pairs of jeans to fade in the sun, then turn them over to fade the other side. For many surfers, this process simply took too long, so they sped up the process by soaking the jeans in diluted bleach and some beach sand. Simple chlorine bleach and muriatic acid were used as they are readily available chemicals used in swimming pools.

=== Mainstream popularity ===
During the early 1980s, skinheads and punk rockers would spatter bleach on their jeans and battle jackets for a mottled effect similar to camouflage. This early faded look, known as snow wash, tended to retain the original dark blue dye around the seams and waistband. One of the first companies to sell "pre washed" jeans (as they were then called), was Guess inc. in 1981. Despite its association with punk fashion, however, the faded effect was copied by many individuals not associated with the subculture, who dipped their jeans in diluted bleach and embellished them with metal studs, embroidery and rhinestones.

The modern process of acid washing was patented in Italy by the Rifle jeans company in February 1986. They accidentally tumbled jeans and pumice stones wetted with a weak solution of bleach in a washing machine without water. American Garment Finishers (AGF) from Texas industrialized the process in North America in June 1986 and offered it to Levi Strauss. Shortly afterward, AGF improved the technique by using potassium permanganate instead of bleach, achieving a more natural abraded look that is far less damaging to the cotton fibers. Other abrading materials such as marble sand or expanded glass foam were also used as an alternative to pumice stone (see stone-wash). Specific areas of the jeans, shirts and jackets were also acid-washed by spraying a solution of bleach or potassium permanganate to simulate a wear pattern. Extremely popular worldwide from 1986 to the mid nineties, it is still used by fashion designers today.

=== Decline and revival ===
Acid wash jeans, worn with fringe jackets or the Perfecto motorcycle jacket were popularised by hard rock, outlaw country and heavy metal bands in the late 1980s. Fans of glam metal favored frayed "destroyed denim," and jeans that had been bleached almost white. Snow washed jeans, which retained more of the original blue dye, remained popular among grunge fans during the mid 1990s, until they were eventually supplanted by darker shades of denim associated with hardcore punk and hip hop fashion. Acid washed jeans made a comeback in the late 2000s among teenage girls, due to a revival of 1980s and 1990s fashions that continued into the 2010s.

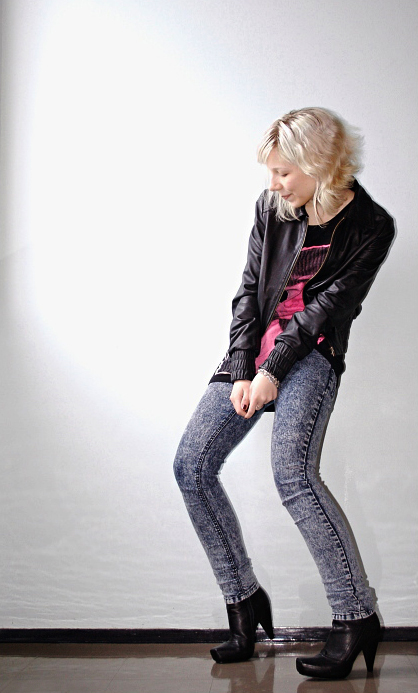
Snow washed jeans, with dark blue seams fashionable during the 1990s

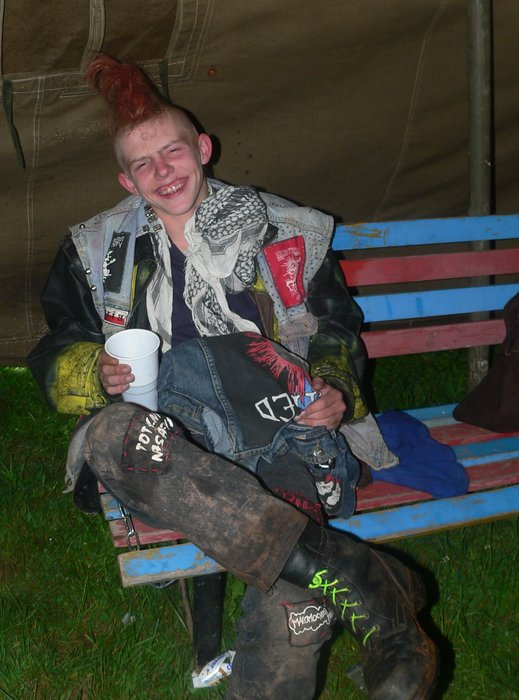
A street punk wearing self-bleached denim vest of the type commonly seen during the early 1980s

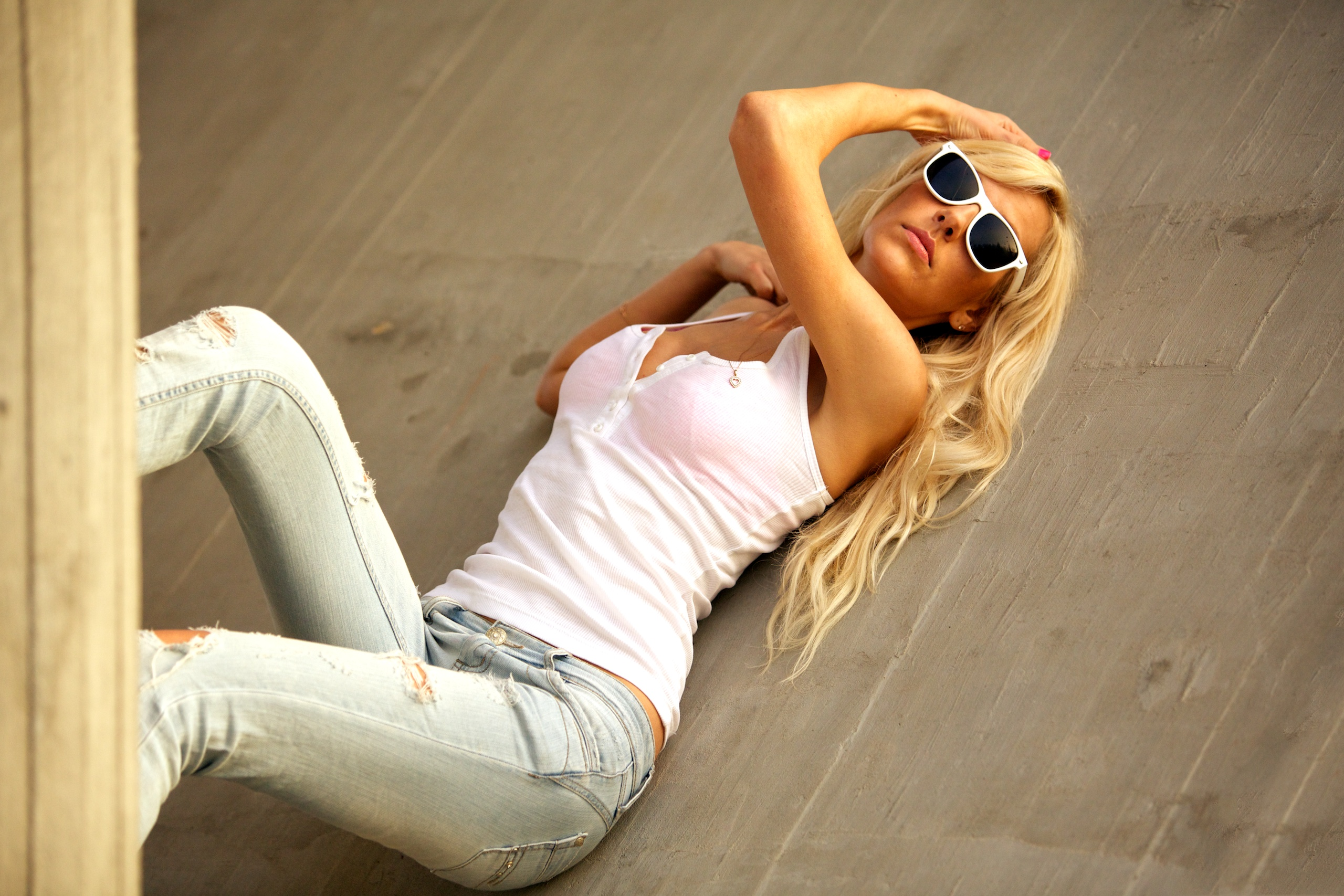
2010s acid wash jeans, similar to the aforementioned snow wash, but bleached almost white

== See also ==
- 1980s in fashion
- 2000s in fashion
- Punk fashion
- Heavy metal fashion
- Washing machine
- Droptima
- Distressing
