= Moriarty (band) =

Multinational band

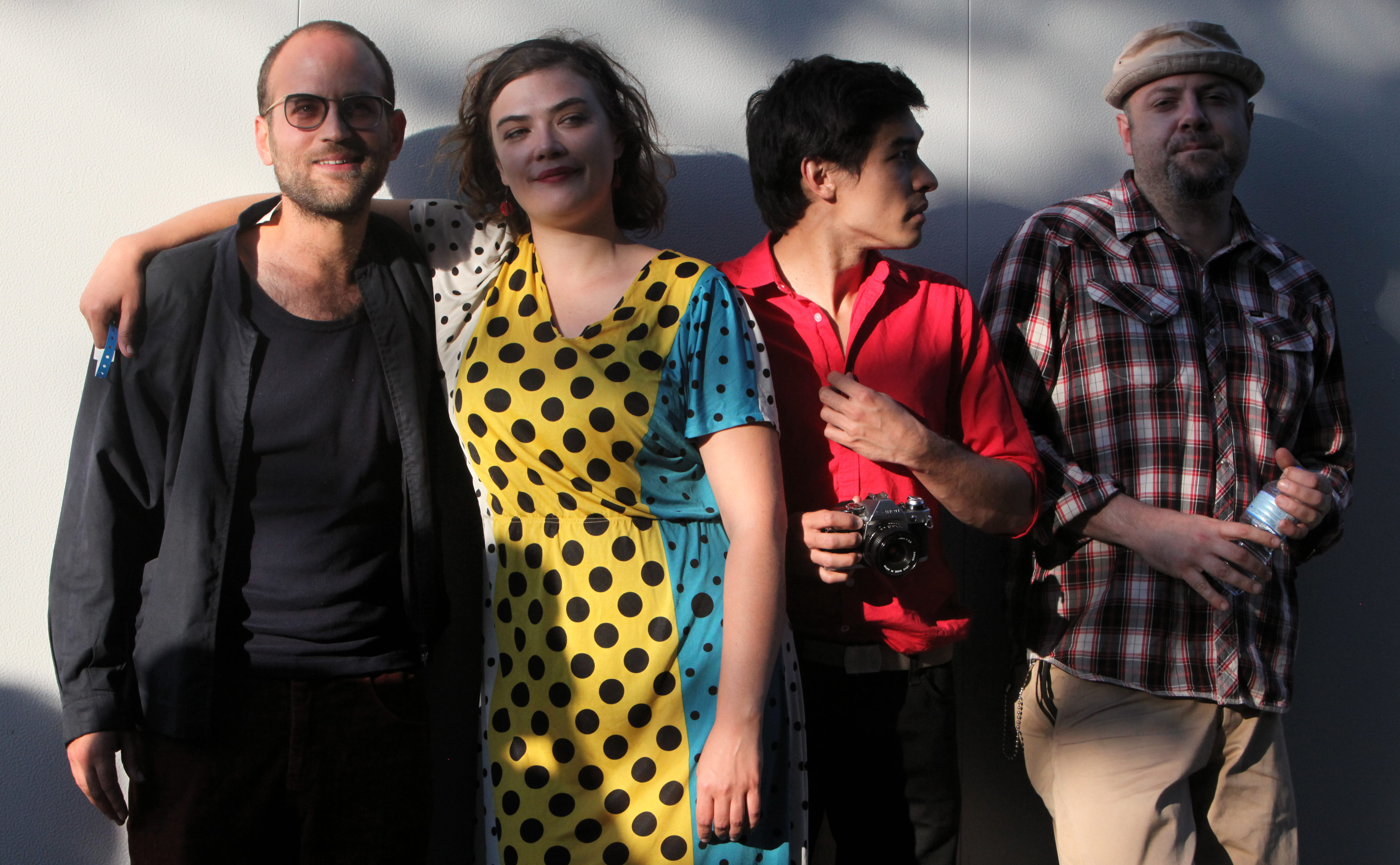
- Moriarty members at the Eurockéennes de Belfort 2011

Background information
- Origin: France, United States, Switzerland
- Genres: Country, blues, rock, folk
- Years active: 1995 – present
- Label: Air Rytmo
- Members: Charles Carmignac; Arthur Gillette; Thomas Puéchavy; Rosemary Standley; Stephan Zimmerli
- Past members: Charlène Dupuy; Médéric de Vanssay; Davide Woods
- Website: https://moriartyland.net/

Moriarty is a French-American musical group formed in 1995. It is a musical collective of five artists of French, American, Swiss and Vietnamese origin, who were mostly born in France to American parents. The group was named Moriarty in reference to Dean Moriarty, the hero of On the Road by Jack Kerouac.

== History ==
Initially, the group consisted of six members. Singer Charlène Dupuy, drummers Médéric de Vanssay and Shaman Lebrun, and saxophonist Davide Woods left in its early years, while Rosemary Standley joined in 1999. The departures of the drummer and percussionists, forced the five remaining members to play acoustically.

This radical change opened up new musical territories for the band, giving them greater freedom in sound experimentation, and allowing them straightforward, stripped-down performances in places such as a prison in Normandy, a mental institution in central France, a ruined castle in Tuscany, and the streets of Paris and Dublin.

The group won the Paris Young Talents Prize in 2005.

=== Gee Whiz But This Is a Lonesome Town ===
In 2007, Moriarty released their first album, Gee Whiz But This Is a Lonesome Town, recorded in eight days by American producer Bob Coke in the attic of a farmhouse in Brittany, near Merlin's tomb. Driven by the opening song "Jimmy", the album was successful in France, and was released in the UK, Germany, Belgium, Switzerland, Italy, Spain, Canada, Japan, Hong Kong, Taiwan, Japan and Australia. The group then began a long French tour which started in April 2008, followed by concerts in Switzerland, Canada, Spain, Germany and England.

In 2008, Moriarty played for a second time at the Solidays music festival where they had already played three years before thanks to the City of Paris emerging talents prize. That same year, they also gave concerts at the Eurockéennes music festival in Belfort, Francofolies de La Rochelle, Montreux Jazz Festival, Festival Internacional de Benicassim and the Festival of the Humanities. They also performed in October 2008 at the Olympia theatre in Paris, to a sold-out audience.

In 2008, Moriarty was one of the 10 artists nominated for the Prix Constantin, and shortly after the band was also nominated for best emerging live act at the Victoires de la Musique French awards.

=== World tour 2009 ===
After a French tour with more than 170 concerts which saw them performing at both larger festivals and smaller theatres, the Franco-American quintet went on an international tour in 2009, starting on 10 January in New York, USA, and then touring the United States, Canada, Germany, Luxembourg, Belgium, the Netherlands, Switzerland, Austria, the Czech Republic, England, Sweden, Spain, Portugal, Japan, Hong Kong, Taiwan, Australia and India. On 24 December 2009, in Mumbai, India, they played the final show of that tour, which spanned 18 countries through 100 concerts. By that time their debut album had sold about 150 000 copies worldwide.

Meanwhile, the members of Moriarty have also appeared as guests on Franco-English singer Emily Loizeau's second release, and were amongst the artists involved in The Fitzcarraldo Sessions project, initiated by members of French rock band Jack the Ripper, with which they co-wrote the single "Alice and Lewis (Soon will come too soon)", released as a first single from the Fitzcarraldo Session's album "We Hear Voices".

=== The Missing Room ===
In 2010 the band started working on a second album, entitled The Missing Room, following a specific process: the songs were composed, then performed and matured on stage during five months of touring, before being actually recorded at the Studio Pigalle in Paris in January 2011. This tour allowed the band to test out the new songs in radically different environments, such as the Fuji Rock Festival in Naeba (Japan), Le Corbusier's Chapelle Notre-Dame du Haut in Ronchamp (France), or in front of the inmates at the prison of Belfort (eastern France).

=== Air Rytmo label ===
In the meantime the band created their own label Air Rytmo in order to release new material according to their own rhythm and with complete artistic freedom. The name of the label is an anagram of Moriarty, emphasizing the fact that the label and the band are one and the same thing.

"The Missing Room" was released in April 2011, following a series of six sold-out concerts at the Trianon in Paris. The album's sleeve and artwork was designed by Moriarty's double-bass player Zim, who conceived it as an illustrated book, containing the storyboard to an imaginary film noir whose plot revolves around a missing room in a hotel. The album cover itself contained an Indian phone number, leading to an answering machine in Mumbai, on which band member Charles recorded an enigma for fans to solve.

The tour that followed lasted two years, taking the band across Europe, Canada, the Indian Ocean, and ending in Australia in March 2013 after over 200 concerts.

In December 2011, the band's label released the vinyl L.P. version of "The Missing Room". 2000 pieces were manufactured and, as an attempt to counteract mass-produced standardisation, within each single record sleeve, hand-crafted by the band members with the help of a few volunteering fans, a different and unique envelope was inserted, containing drawings, newspaper clippings, old set lists, broken guitar strings and other paraphernalia rescued from the tour.

In 2011, French stage director Marc Lainé wrote a play inspired by "The Missing Room". The resulting show, entitled "Memories From The Missing Room", was set in a motel room, whose walls and floor revolved to reveal the band Moriarty performing their album live on stage (in the same order as the record's track list), along with three actors impersonating the characters from the songs, and artist Philippe Dupuy drawing backgrounds projected in real-time. The performance, first created at the Ferme du Buisson arts center near Paris, was then played for four weeks in a row at the Théâtre de la Bastille in Paris in September 2012.

=== Salem Tradition ===
In January and June 2012, while touring Réunion, the band met with local singer Christine Salem and her musicians, and started working on new, co-written material. The resulting songs, an encounter between Moriarty's blues, folk and rock songwriting and Salem's percussion-driven maloya, were first performed at a clandestine gig in the sugarcane fields above St-Pierre de la Réunion, then recorded in August 2012 and released on Christine Salem's album "Salem Tradition". In December 2012 the two bands got together for a tour of France, then in February 2013 they performed again in Réunion, and finally at the WOMADelaide festival in Adelaide, Australia, on 7 March 2013.

=== Moriarty Meets Mama Rosin ===
In July 2009, Moriarty met Swiss cajun-rock band Mama Rosin at a festival in Lausanne, Switzerland. Attracted by shared musical tastes and philosophy, the two bands started a collaboration, playing together at the Festival du Bout du Monde (France) in August 2011, the Festival Interceltique de Lorient (France) in August 2012 and the Flèche d'Or, Paris, in April 2013. Moriarty and Mama Rosin recorded five songs at the Studio Pigalle in Paris in February 2013, and released them on an E.P. 10-inch vinyl record entitled "Moriarty Meets Mama Rosin", for the Record Store Day on 20 April 2013.

=== Fugitives ===
In 2013, Moriarty recorded and released an album called "Fugitives", with songs from blues and folk songwriters from the 1920s to the 1950s.

=== Epitaph and Vanishing Point ===
In 2015, the band recorded "Epitaph", their 4th Album.

In 2014 and 2015, The musicians of the band wrote the soundtrack to the theater play "Vanishing Point", staged by French director Marc Lainé, and performed it live for 80 shows in France and in Montreal.

=== Epiphany ===
In 2016, Moriarty revealed Epiphany, a ghost album of 14 songs that had been buried in boxes hidden in 14 spots around the world. They disclosed it through a map and a series of enigmas leading the listeners to the hiding places. The audience had to physically travel to the remote locations to unearth the songs.

=== Echoes from the Borderline ===
In July 2017, Moriarty launched a crowdfunding campaign on Ulule website for their 5th album: "Echoes from the Borderline", a collection of live recordings collected by the band over ten years of touring. During the tour, the bassist of the band Zim Moriarty took analog pictures, that were gathered to form a Photo-book to accompany the music with images.

== Members ==
- Rosemary Standley aka Rosemary Moriarty - lead vocal, guitar
- Thomas Puéchavy alias Tom Moriarty - harmonica, accordion, Jew's harp
- Arthur B. Gillette alias Arthur Moriarty - guitar, piano, keyboards, backing vocals
- Stephan Zimmerli alias Zim Moriarty - double bass, guitar, backing vocals
- Charles Carmignac, alias Charles Moriarty - dobro, electric guitar
- Vincent Talpaert and Éric Tafani - drums, percussion

Former members: Charlène Dupuy, Médéric de Vanssay, Shaman Lebrun, Davide Woods.

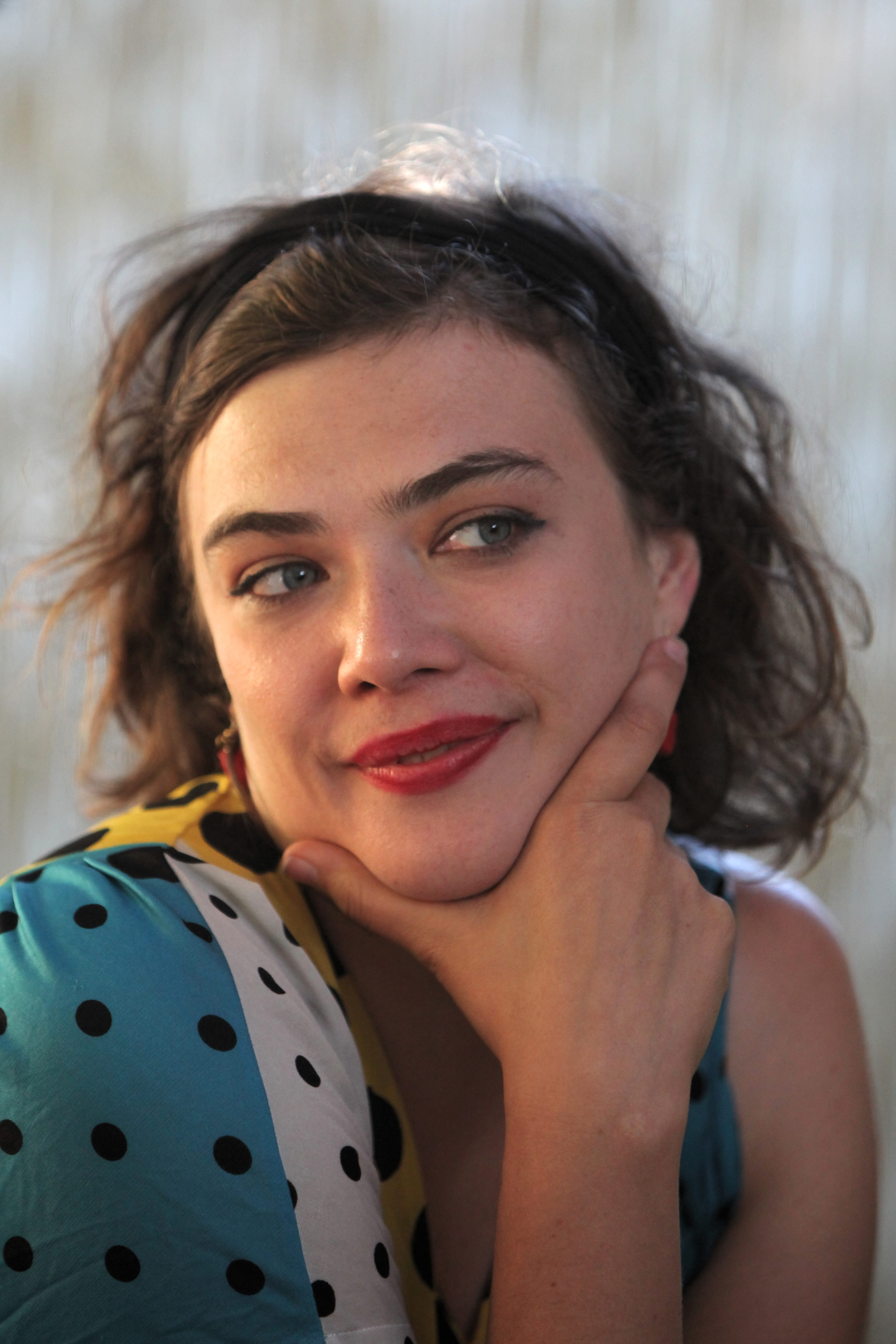
Rosemary Standley

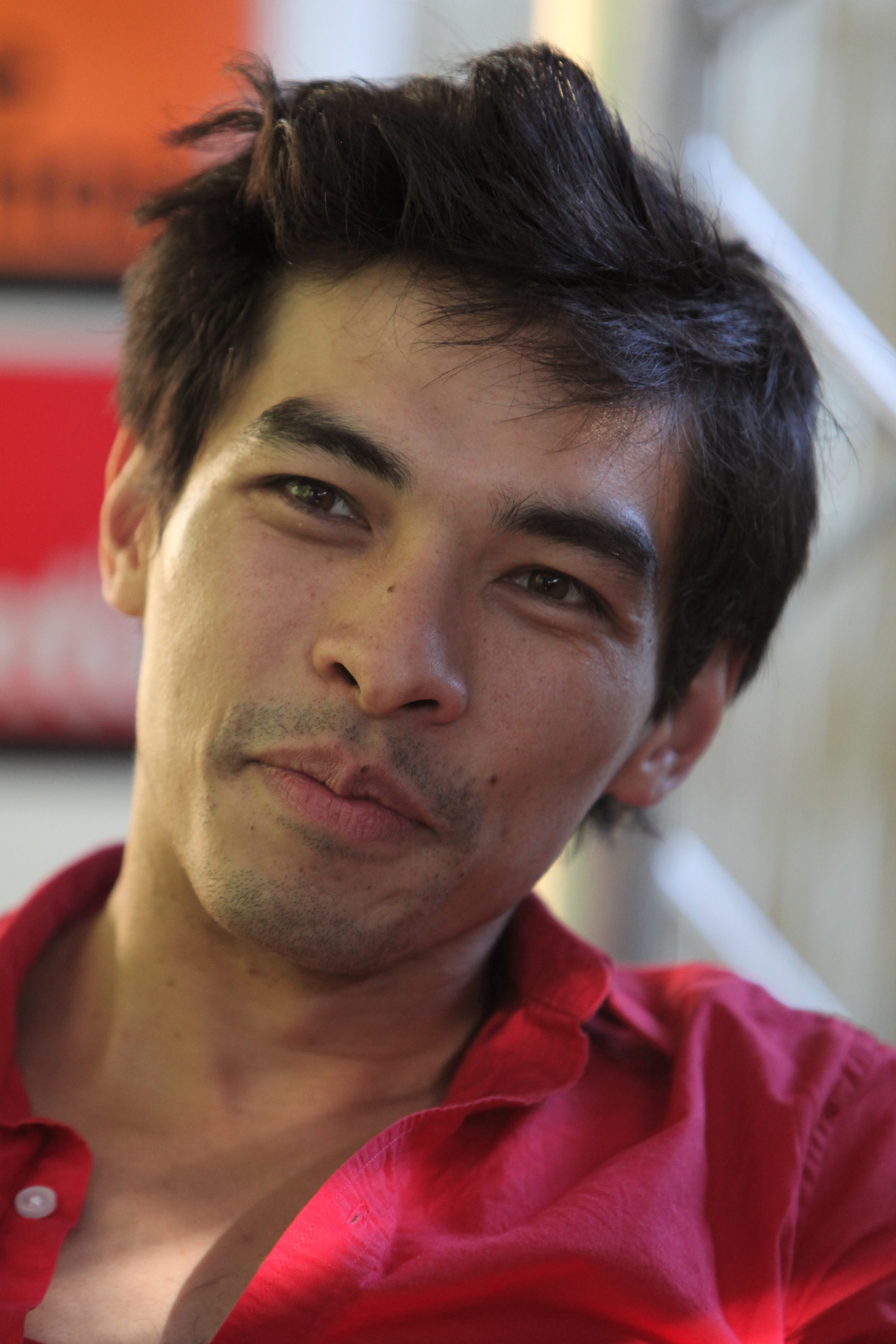
Stephan Zimmerli

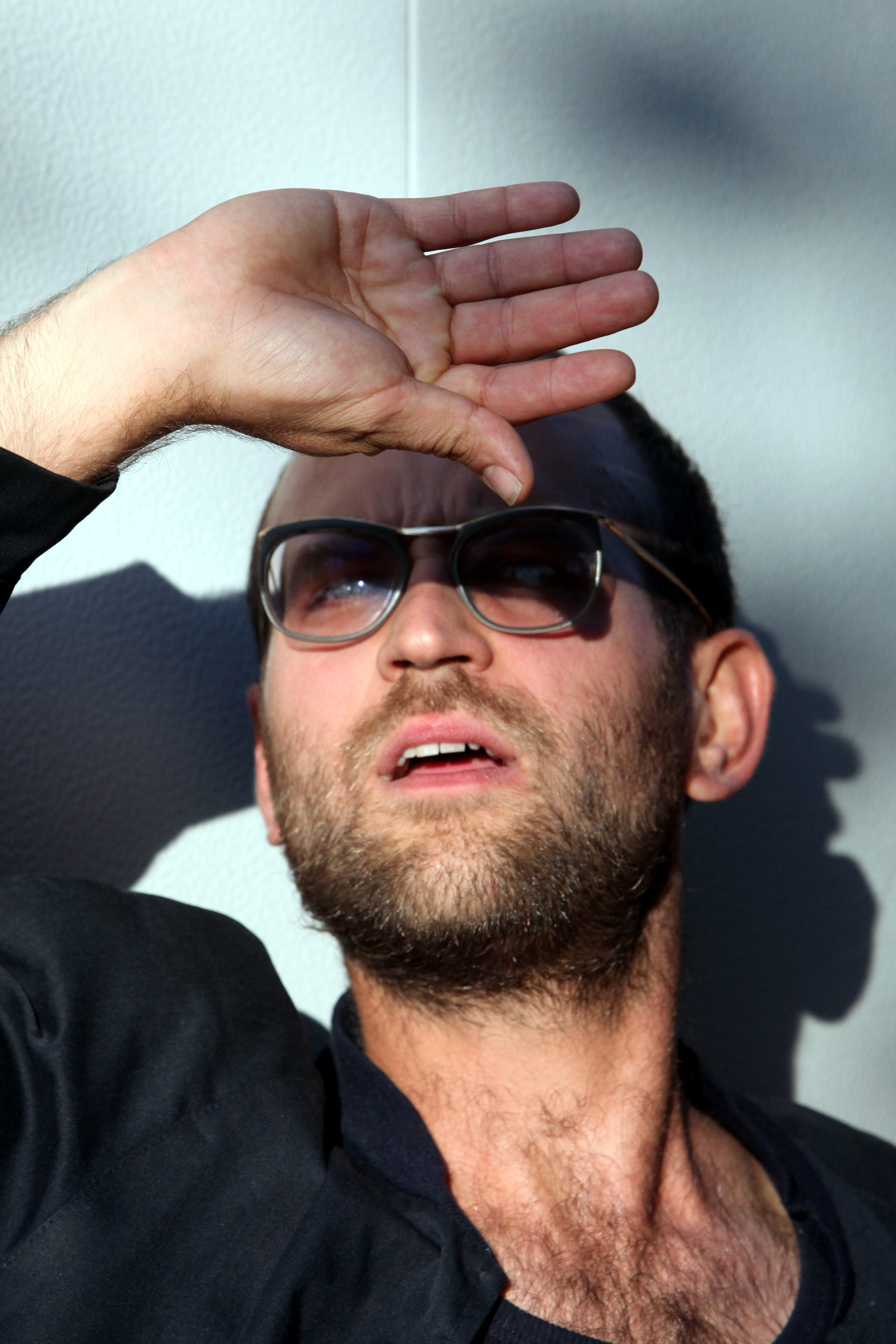
Thomas Puéchavy

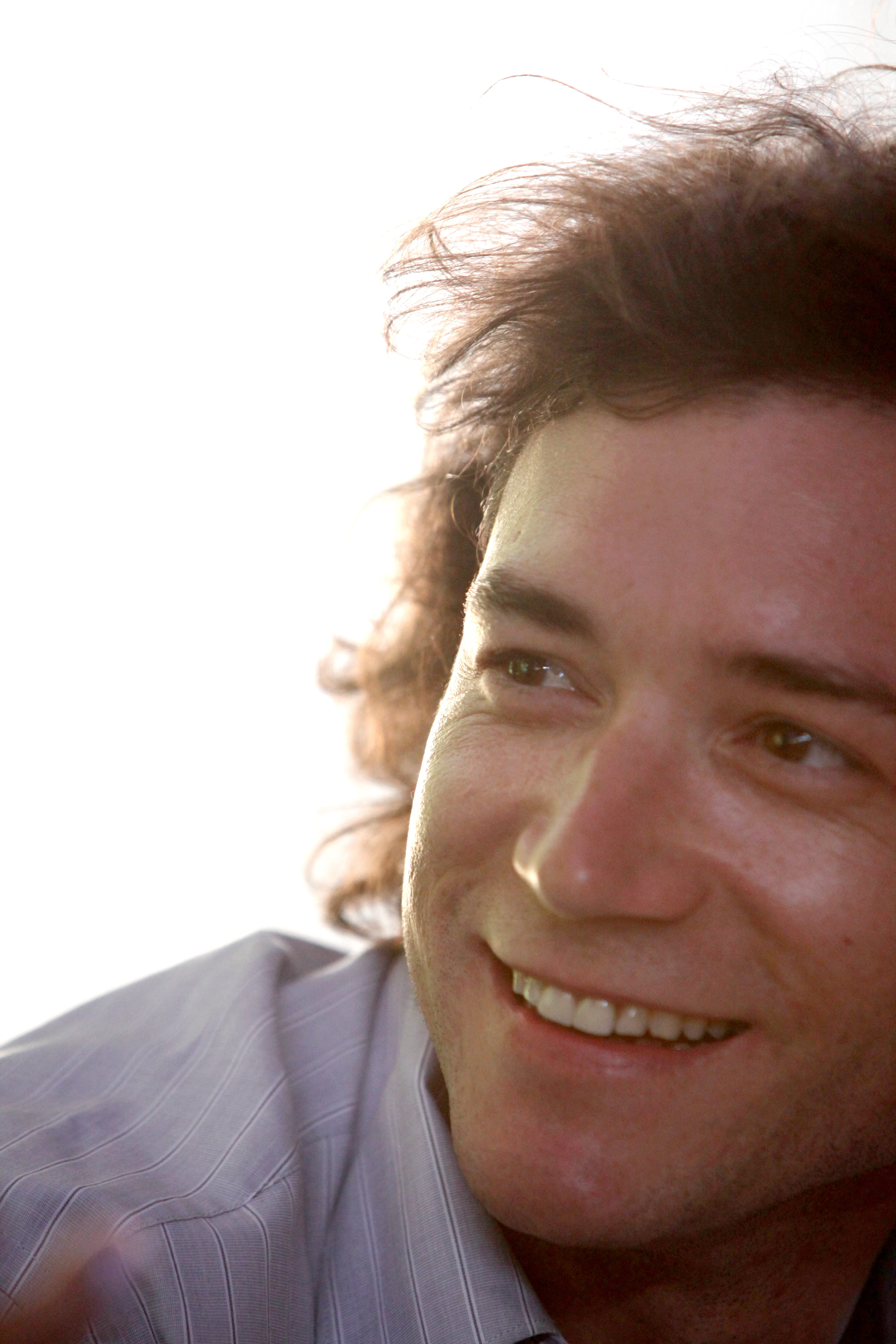
Charles Carmignac

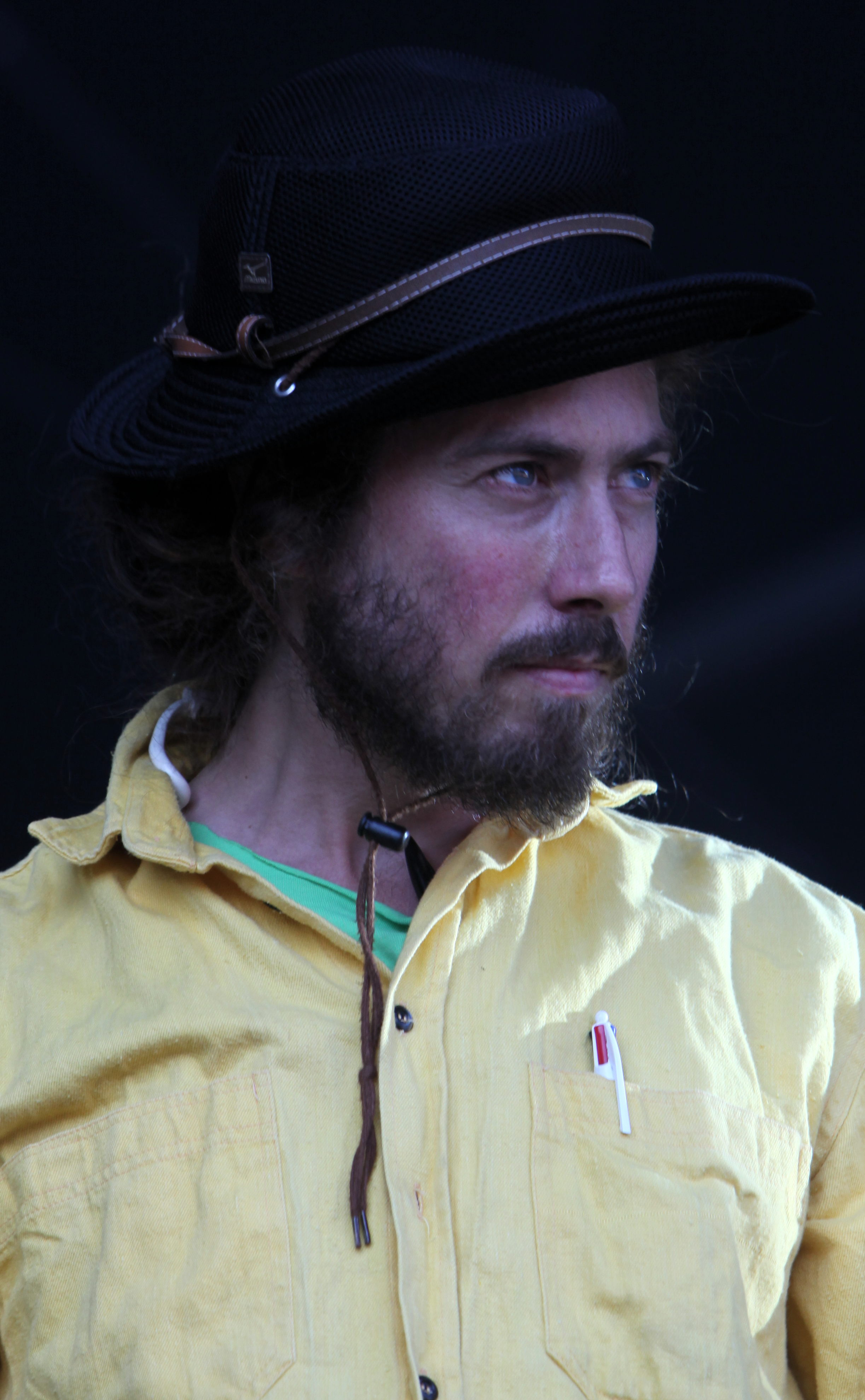
Arthur B. Gillette

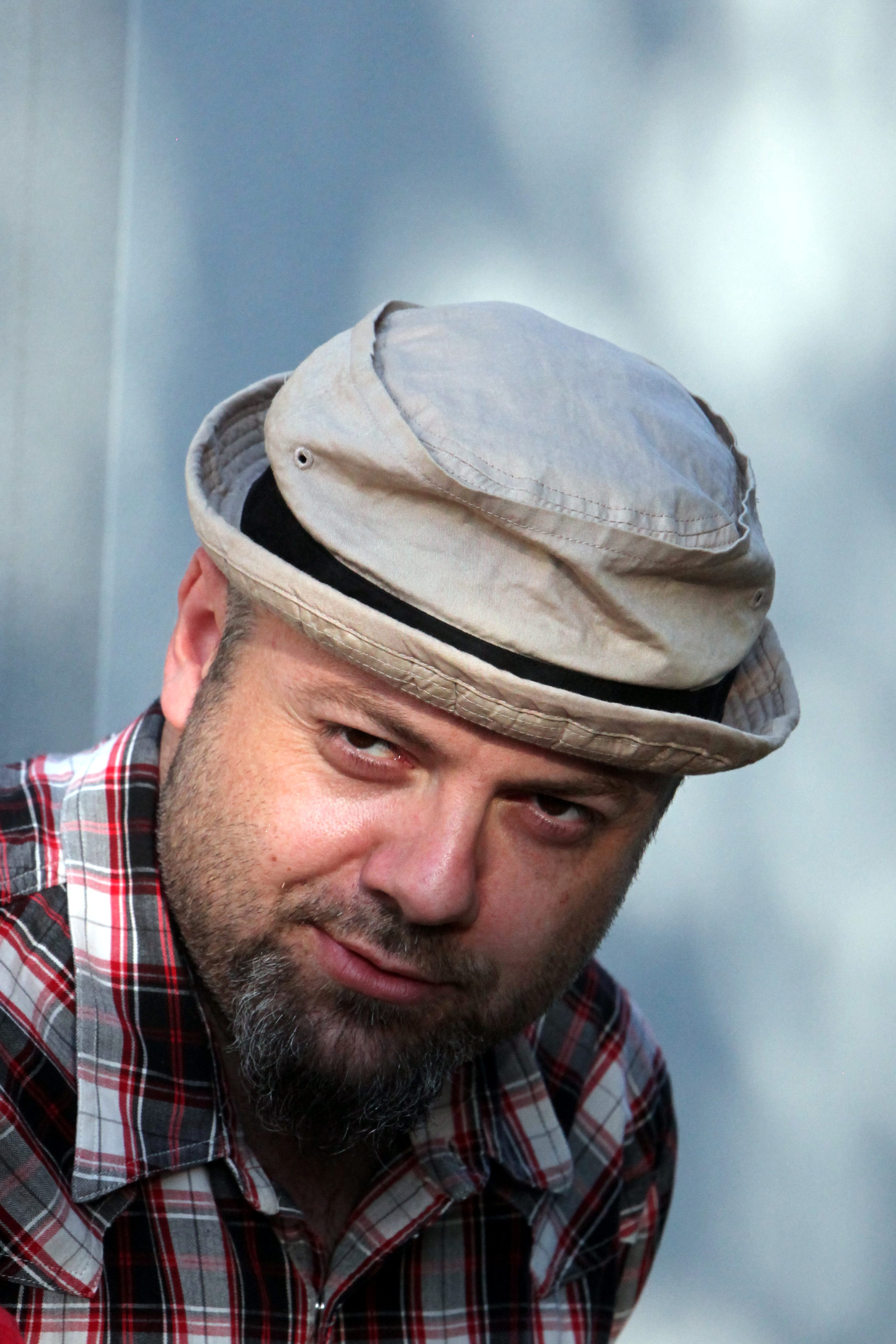
Vincent Talpaert

== Discography ==
=== Albums and EPs ===
Album	Peak positions			Certification
Album	FR	BEL (Wa)	SWI	Certification
The Ghostless Takes: Date released: 2006; Format: EP; Record label: Self-published	–	–	–	
Gee Whiz But This Is a Lonesome Town: Date released: 2007; Format: LP; Record label: Naïve Records	19	99	–	
The Missing Room: Date released: 2011; Format: LP; Record label: Air Rytmo	14	34	–	
Moriarty Meets Mama Rosin: In collaboration with Mama Rosin; Date released: 2013; Format: LP; Record label: Air Rytmo	–	–	–	
Fugitives: Date released: October 2013; Format: LP; Record label:	24	173	–	
Epitaph: Date released: April 2015; Format: LP; Record label:	7	–	90	
Epiphany: Date released: 10 November 2017; Format: LP; Record label: Air Rytmo	190	–	–	

Soundtracks

- 2009: The Lost Scenes of Puss'n'Boots - movie soundtrack EP (Naïve Records)

Limited edition releases

- 2007: Jimmy - limited edition 7-inch
- 2009: Gee Whiz But This Is a Lonesome Town/The Drifting Letter Office Archive - limited edition re-issue with bonus tracks (Naïve Records)
- 2011: Isabella - limited edition 7-inch (Air Rytmo)

Featured in

- 2008: La Musique de Paris Dernière - compilation appearance (Naïve Records)
- 2009: Pays Sauvage - featuring on Emily Loizeau's album (Polydor)
- 2010: We Hear Voices - featuring on The Fitzcarraldo Sessions' album (Green United Music)
- 2012: Salem Tradition - featuring on Christine Salem's album (Cobalt)

=== Singles ===
Year	Singles	Peak positions		Album
Year	Singles	FR	BEL (Wa)	Album
2013	"Belle"	111	–	Fugitives
2013	"Matty Groves"	191	–	Fugitives

== Film / documentary ==
- 2007: J'irai dormir à Hollywood - ".../Bats" featuring in the soundtrack to the documentary by Antoine de Maximy
- 2009: La véritable histoire du Chat Botté / The true story of Puss'n'Boots - soundtrack to the animated movie directed by P.Herold, J.Deschamps, M.Makéïeff
- 2009: Romaine par moins trente - "Jimmy" featuring in the soundtrack to the movie by Agnès Obadia
- 2010: Une peine infinie - soundtrack to the documentary directed by David André
- 2014: Gemma Bovery ("Jimmy" and "Cottonflower" featured in the soundtrack)

== Theater / performance ==
- 2009: "La nuit, un rêve féroce" - soundtrack to the play written by Mike Kenny, directed by Marc Lainé (Théâtre de Nîmes)
- 2009: "Elephant feelings" - soundtrack and live interpretation for the performance based on the novel written by John Haskell, directed by Marc Lainé (CDDB Lorient)
- 2011: "Memories from the Missing Room" - soundtrack and live interpretation for the play written and directed by Marc Lainé (Ferme du Buisson / Théâtre de la Bastille)
