= Luo Zhaohui =

Chinese diplomat

- 罗照辉
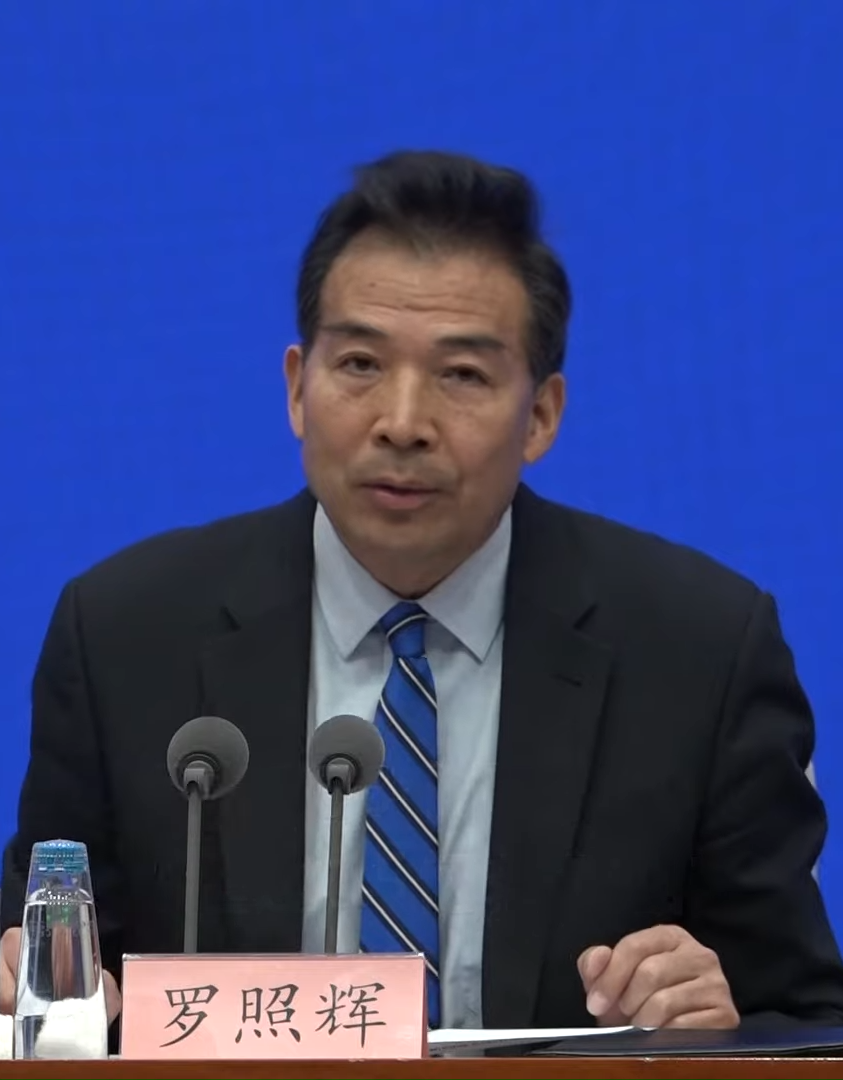
- Luo in 2021

Director of China International Development Cooperation Agency
- In office April 2021 – April 2025
- Preceded by: Wang Xiaotao
- Succeeded by: Chen Xiaodong

Vice Minister of Foreign Affairs
- In office 2019–2021 Serving with Zheng Zeguang, Ma Zhaoxu, Qin Gang
- Minister: Wang Yi

Chinese Ambassador to India
- In office September 2016 – May 2019
- Preceded by: Le Yucheng
- Succeeded by: Sun Weidong

Chinese Ambassador to Canada
- In office May 2014 – September 2016
- Preceded by: Zhang Junsai
- Succeeded by: Lu Shaye

Chinese Ambassador to Pakistan
- In office March 2007 – June 2010
- Preceded by: Zhang Chunxiang
- Succeeded by: Liu Jian

Personal details
- Born: February 1962 (age 64) Xiaogan, Hubei, China
- Party: Chinese Communist Party
- Spouse: Jiang Yili
- Children: 1

Chinese name
- Simplified Chinese: 罗照辉
Transcriptions
Standard Mandarin
- Hanyu Pinyin: Luó Zhàohuī

Luo Zhaohui (Chinese: 罗照辉; born February 1962) is a Chinese diplomat who became the director of the China International Development Cooperation Agency on 18 April 2021. He previously served as Chinese Ambassador to Pakistan (2007–2010), Canada (2014–2016) and India (2016–2019).

== Biography ==
Luo Zhaohui was born in Xiaogan, Hubei, in February 1962. In 1982, he graduated with a bachelor's degree in history from Central China Normal University and later received master's degree in history from Peking University, and worked as a part-time professor at Central China Normal University.

From 1985 to 1989, he served as attaché and Third Secretary of the Department of Asian Affairs within the Ministry of Foreign Affairs. He served as the Third Secretary and Second Secretary at the Chinese Embassy in India from 1989 to 1993.

From 1993 to 1996, he served as the Second Secretary and deputy director of the Department of American and Oceanian Affairs at Ministry of Foreign Affairs. Luo served as the Second Secretary and First Secretary of the Chinese Embassy in the United States from 1996 to 2000 and from 2000 to 2003, he served as Counselor of the Asian Department of the Ministry of Foreign Affairs. From 2003 to 2004, he served as Minister Counselor at the Chinese Embassy in Singapore.

From 2004 to 2006, he served as Deputy Director-General of the Department of Asian Affairs at the Foreign Ministry. He served as the Chinese Ambassador to Pakistan from 2007 through 2010. From June 2010, he served as Director-General of the Department of Foreign Security Affairs of the Foreign Ministry.

In March 2011, he was appointed as Director-General of the Department of Asian Affairs of the Ministry of Foreign Affairs. From May 2014 to September 2016, he served as the Chinese Ambassador to Canada and in 2016, he was appointed as the Chinese Ambassador to India, succeeding Le Yucheng. He served this position until May 2019 and on the same month, he succeeded Kong Xuanyou as Vice-Minister of Foreign Affairs.

In April 2021, he was appointed as the director of the China International Development Cooperation Agency, succeeding Wang Xiaotao. In April 2025, he was succeeded by Chen Xiaodong.

He was appointed as a member of the 14th National Committee of the Chinese People's Political Consultative Conference on 17 January 2023 from the Friendship with Foreign Countries Sector.

== Personal life ==
Luo is married to Jiang Yili, a diplomat and a scholar of Indian philosophy and religion, and politics of South Asia. The couple have a daughter.

== Foreign honors ==
- Hilal-i-Quaid-i-Azam (Pakistan, January 2009)
- Sitara-i-Quaid-i- Azam (Pakistan, 2007)
- Lifetime Achievement in Diplomacy Award of the Unity International Foundation (India, May 2019)

Diplomatic posts
Preceded by Zhang Chunxiang (罗照辉)	Chinese Ambassador to Pakistan; 2007–2010	Succeeded by Liu Jian
Preceded by Zhang Junsai (章均赛)	Chinese Ambassador to Canada; 2014-2016	Succeeded by Lu Shaye
Preceded by Le Yucheng	Chinese Ambassador to India; 2016-2019	Succeeded by Sun Weidong
