= Li Hui (diplomat) =

Chinese diplomat

- 李辉
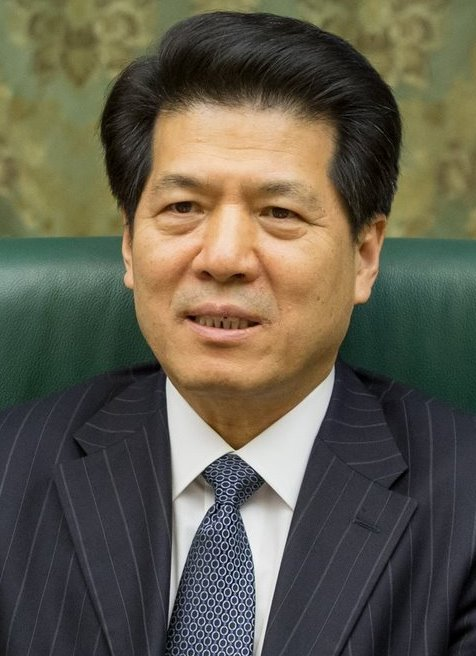
- Li Hui in December 2018.

China's Special Representative on Eurasian Affairs
- Incumbent
- Assumed office September 2019
- Preceded by: Office established

Chinese Ambassador to Russia
- In office August 2009 – August 2019
- Preceded by: Liu Guchang
- Succeeded by: Zhang Hanhui

Chinese Ambassador to Kazakhstan
- In office August 1997 – March 2000
- Preceded by: Chen Di
- Succeeded by: Yao Peisheng

Personal details
- Born: February 1953 (age 73) Heilongjiang, China
- Party: Chinese Communist Party
- Children: 1 (daughter)
- Education: Beijing Foreign Studies University

Chinese name
- Simplified Chinese: 李辉
- Traditional Chinese: 李輝
Transcriptions
Standard Mandarin
- Hanyu Pinyin: Lǐ Huī

Li Hui (Chinese: 李辉, born February 1953) is a Chinese diplomat who serves as the Chinese Special Representative for Eurasian Affairs since August 2019. He previously served as the Chinese Ambassador to Russia (2009–2019) and Kazakhstan (1997–2000), and Vice Minister of Foreign Affairs (2008–2009).

== Diplomatic career ==
=== USSR ===
After graduation from the Beijing Foreign Studies University in 1975, Li joined the Ministry of Foreign Affairs of China. From 1975 to 1981, he worked in the USSR and Europe Department of the Ministry of Foreign Affairs and from 1981 to 1985, he worked as an Attaché, Second Secretary and Third Secretary at the Chinese Embassy in the USSR.

After his return to China in 1985, he served as the Second Secretary, Deputy Head of the Department and First Secretary in the USSR and Europe Department of the Ministry of Foreign Affairs. From 1991 to 1992, he was the first secretary of the Chinese Embassy in the USSR and following the dissolution of the Soviet Union in 1991, became the first secretary of the Chinese Embassy in Russia.

=== Kazakhstan ===
In 1992, he was appointed as the First Secretary and adviser at the Chinese Embassy in Kazakhstan. From 1995 to 1997, he held the positions of Counsellor and Deputy Director General of the Eurasian Department at the Ministry of Foreign Affairs. In 1997, he was appointed as Chinese Ambassador to Kazakhstan and served this position till 1999.

Throughout Li Hui's ambassadorship to Kazakhstan, he vigorously advocated for China-Kazakhstan border negotiations, energy collaboration, and bilateral economic and trade interactions, establishing a robust foundation for the enduring stability of China-Kazakhstan relations. To delineate certain small sections of the border more precisely, additional agreements were signed on 24 September 1997 and 4 July 1998.

=== Russia ===
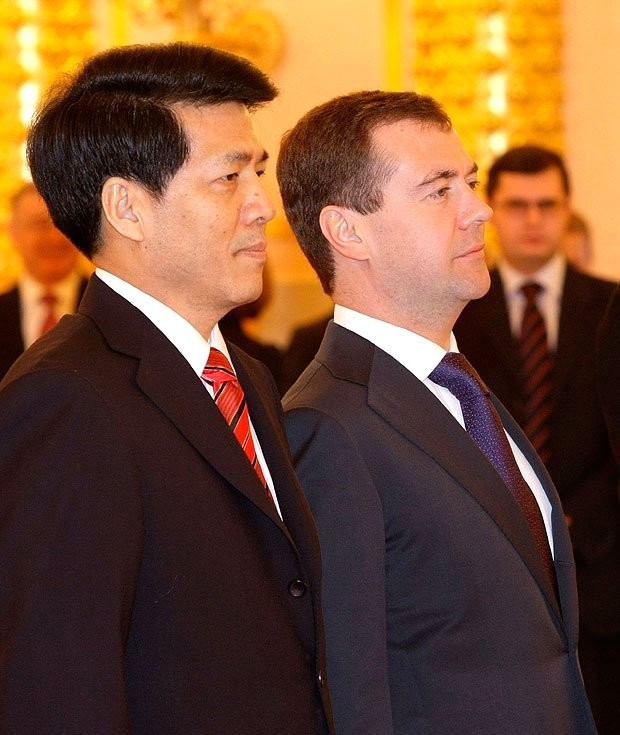
Li Hui presented his credentials to Russian President Dmitry Medvedev on 16 December 2009

From 1999 to 2003, he served as the head of the Europe and Asia Department of the Ministry of Foreign Affairs and from 2003 to 2008, he served assistant to the Minister of Foreign Affairs.

In 2008, he was appointed as Vice Minister of Foreign Affairs. On 13 August 2009, he was appointed as the Chinese Ambassador to Russia by the then 11th National People's Congress, succeeding Liu Guchang. He presented his credentials to Russian President Dmitry Medvedev on 16 December 2009.

Li served this position till 10 August 2019 and was the longest serving Chinese Ambassador to Russia. Throughout Li Hui's service as China's ambassador to Russia, the leaders of China and Russia—Chinese leaders Hu Jintao (until 2012) and Xi Jinping (since 2012), alongside Russian Presidents Dmitry Medvedev (2008–2012) and Vladimir Putin (2012-present)—have conducted numerous high-level meetings. During 2013–2014, the parties advocated for the execution of a Sino-Russian gas supply agreement, valued at $400 billion, pertaining to the Power of Siberia gas pipeline.

=== Special Representative for European Affairs ===
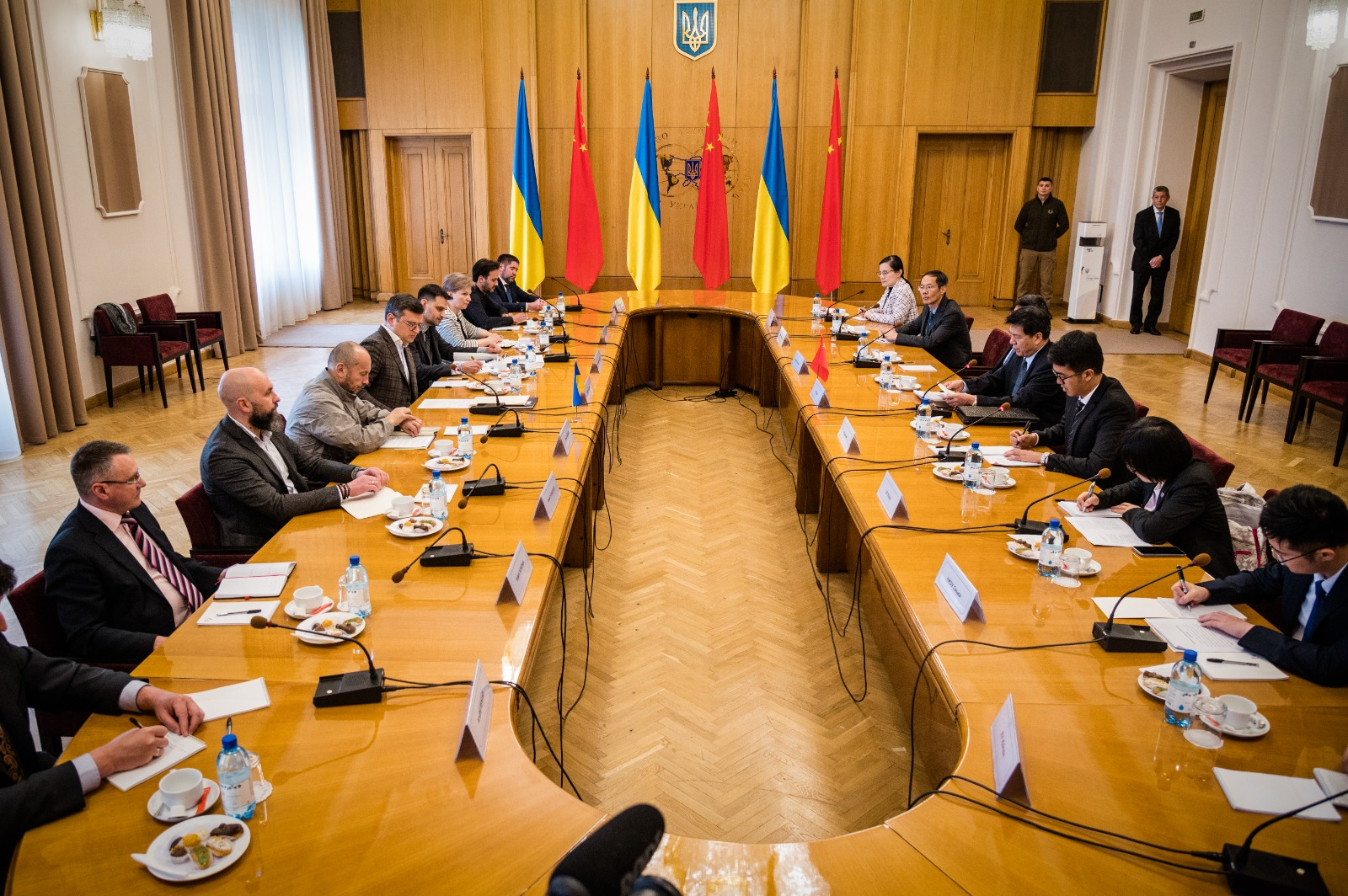
Li Hui meets with Ukrainian Foreign Minister Dmytro Kuleba in Kyiv, 17 May 2023

In August 2019, he was appointed as the Chinese Special Representative for Eurasian Affairs. In a 2020 essay for the Chinese People's Institute of Foreign Affairs, he wrote that China and Russia "will, as always, show firm support for each other’s efforts to uphold one’s own sovereignty, security, territorial integrity and other core interests."

On 26 April 2023, he was appointed as Chinese special representative for the settlement of the Russo-Ukrainian War and visited Russia, Ukraine, Germany, Poland and France to take part in the talks seeking to resolve the conflict. From 16 to 17 May 2023, Li visited Ukraine and during the visit, he met with the Ukrainian Foreign Minister Dmytro Kuleba. The parties discussed the principles of restoring a stable and just peace based on respect for the sovereignty and territorial integrity of Ukraine, while Kuleba stated that Ukraine would not accept any proposals that would involve the loss of its territories or freezing of the conflict. Li also took part in the briefing of current security situation in Ukraine at the office of the President of Ukraine. European officials reportedly criticized China's peace plan as an attempt at "freezing" the conflict in place and splitting the West in pushing Ukraine cease-fire, though this view of China's attempt was disputed by Kuleba.

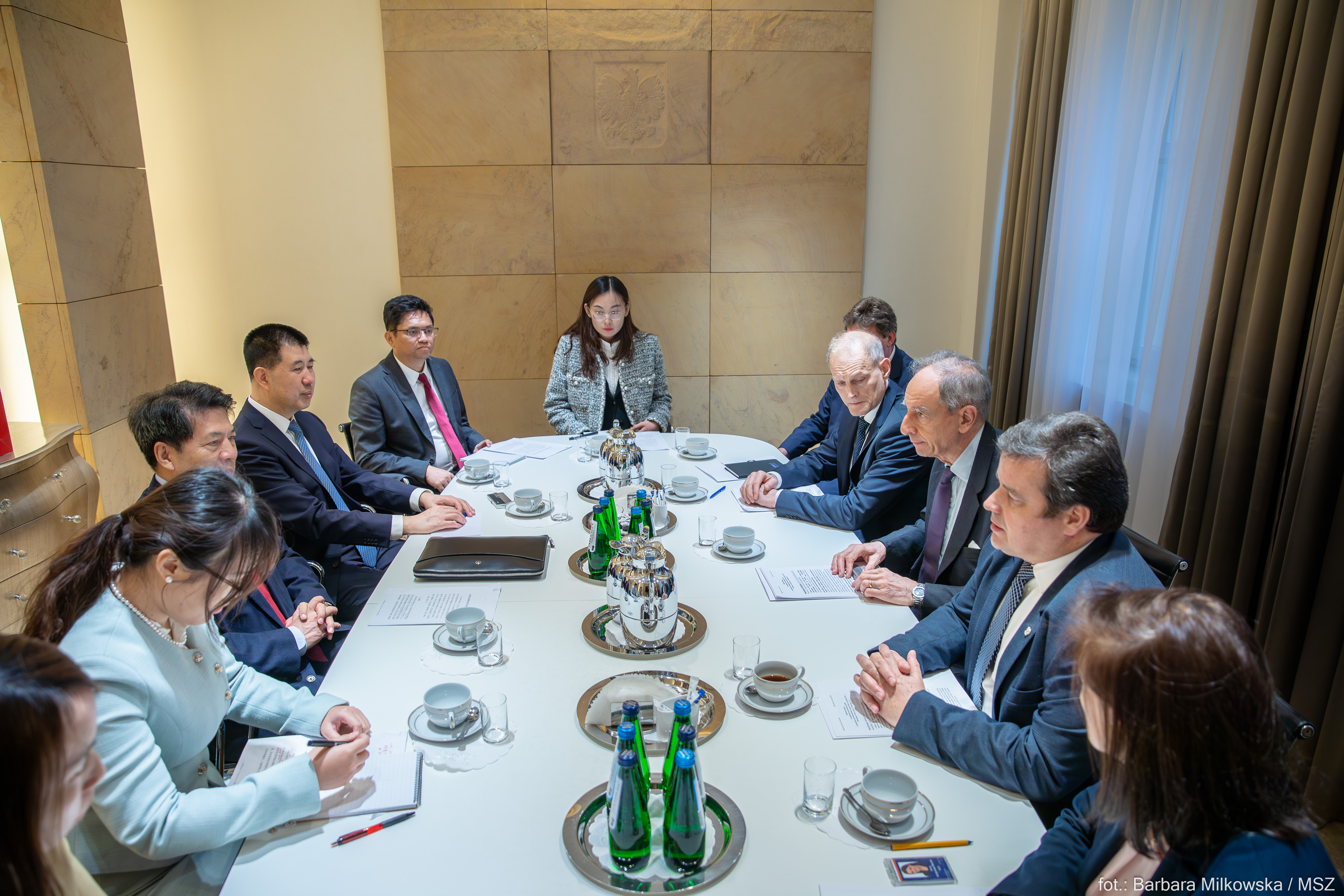
Polish Deputy Minister Władysław Teofil Bartoszewski met Li Hui on March 6, 2024

In March 2024, during his journey to Russia, Ukraine, and pertinent European nations, Li Hui engaged in his second round of comprehensive discussions with the parties over the implementation of a ceasefire, the prompt conclusion of the conflict, and the advancement of a political resolution to the problem. From May 3 to 9, 2024, Li Hui, the Special Representative of the Chinese Government for Eurasian Affairs, engaged in the third round of shuttle diplomacy towards the political resolution of the Ukrainian problem, visiting Turkey, Egypt, Saudi Arabia, and the United Arab Emirates (UAE). On June 5, 2024, Li Hui was invited to confer with Andrii Sybiha, the First Deputy Foreign Minister of Ukraine, who visited China for meetings with the Ministry of Foreign Affairs of both nations.

In August 2024, Li Hui traveled to Brazil, South Africa, and Indonesia as the Chinese government's special representative for Eurasian affairs to engage in the fourth round of shuttle diplomacy on the Ukraine issue.

== Personal life ==
He is married and has one daughter.

== Awards and honors ==
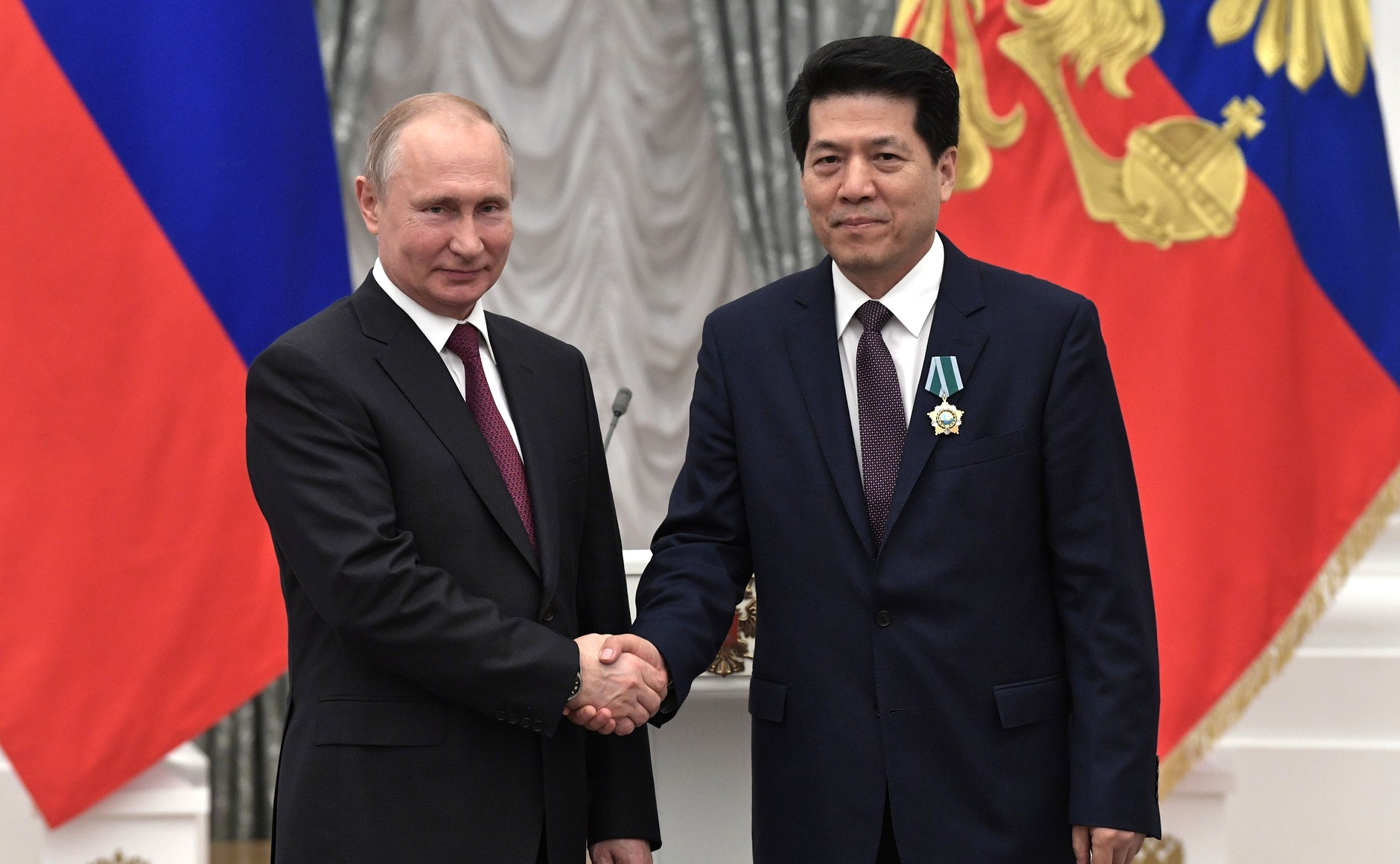
President of Russia Vladimir Putin awards Li with an Order of Friendship in May 2019

Kazakhstan:

- Order of Friendship, 2nd class (2021)

Russia:

- Order of Friendship (2019)
- Gratitude of the President of the Russian Federation (2006)
- Honorary Doctorate and Honorary Member of the Academic Council of Moscow State Linguistic University (2013)
- Honorary Doctorate of the Diplomatic Academy of the Ministry of Foreign Affairs of the Russian Federation (2018)

Diplomatic posts
Preceded by Chen Di	Ambassador of China to Kazakhstan; 1997–2000	Succeeded by Yao Peisheng
Preceded by Liu Guchang	Ambassador of China to Russia; 2009–2019	Succeeded by Zhang Hanhui
