= Le Yucheng =

Chinese politician

- 乐玉成
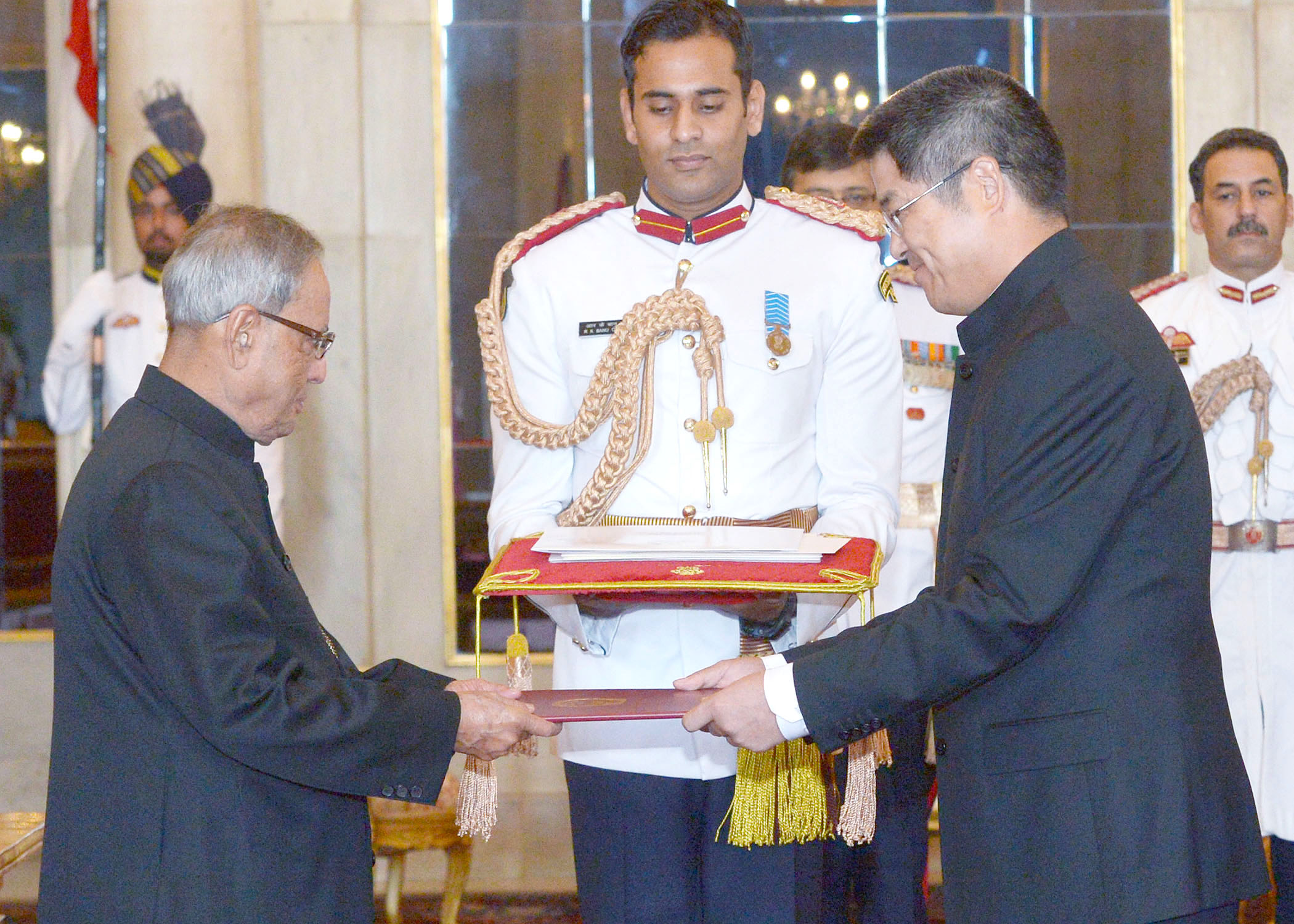
- Yucheng presenting his credentials to then India President Pranab Mukherjee at Rashtrapati Bhavan, New Delhi (2014)

Deputy Director of the National Radio and Television Administration
- In office June 2022 – July 2023
- Premier: Li Keqiang; Li Qiang

Executive Vice Minister of Foreign Affairs
- In office March 2018 – June 2022
- Minister: Wang Yi
- Premier: Li Keqiang
- Succeeded by: Ma Zhaoxu

Chinese Ambassador to India
- In office 12 September 2014 – 1 April 2016
- Preceded by: Wei Wei
- Succeeded by: Luo Zhaohui

Chinese Ambassador to Kazakhstan
- In office 8 August 2013 – September 2014
- Preceded by: Zhou Li
- Succeeded by: Zhang Hanhui

Personal details
- Born: June 1963 (age 62) Yangzhou, Jiangsu, China
- Party: Chinese Communist Party

Le Yucheng (Chinese: 乐玉成; pinyin: Lè Yùchéng; born in June 1963) is a Chinese retired diplomat and politician. He served as Deputy Minister of Foreign Affairs between 2018 and 2022.

== Career ==
Born in Yangzhou, in 1986 Yucheng graduated in Russian language and literature at the Nanjing Normal University and then started a diplomacy career joining the Soviet Union's East European Department of the Ministry of Foreign Affairs. Among other assignments, he served as Minister Counsellor and Minister at the Embassy of the Russian Federation, Chinese ambassador to Kazakhstan between 2013 and 2014, and to India between 2014 and 2016, and deputy director of the Central Foreign Affairs Commission.

In October 2017, Le was elected as an alternate member of the 19th Central Committee of the Chinese Communist Party, and in March 2018, he was appointed deputy Minister of Foreign Affairs.

Once considered a potential successor to Foreign Minister Wang Yi, in June 2022 Le was instead moved to the position of deputy director of the National Radio and Television Administration (NRTA), which was widely seen as a demotion. He further lost his alternate membership in the Central Committee after the 20th CCP National Congress, and was retired from the position of deputy director of the NRTA in July 2023 after reaching the age of 60.
