= Liu Guchang =

Chinese diplomat (born 1946)

- 刘古昌
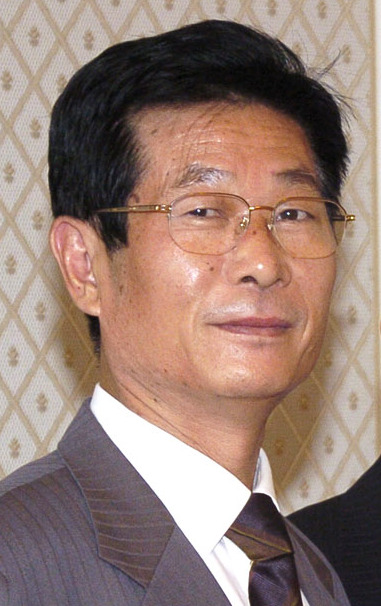
- 2009

Chinese Ambassador to Russia
- In office November 2003 – July 2009
- Preceded by: Zhang Deguang
- Succeeded by: Li Hui

Chinese Ambassador to Romania
- In office March 1996 – August 1999
- Preceded by: Lu Qiutian
- Succeeded by: Chen Delai

Personal details
- Born: July 1946 (age 80) Yancheng, Jiangsu, China
- Party: Chinese Communist Party

Chinese name
- Simplified Chinese: 刘古昌
- Traditional Chinese: 劉古昌
Transcriptions
Standard Mandarin
- Hanyu Pinyin: Liú Gǔchāng

Liu Guchang (Chinese: 刘古昌, born 1946 in Jiangsu) was the Ambassador Extraordinary and Plenipotentiary of the People's Republic of China to the Russian Federation from 2003 to 2009. He also served as China's Vice Minister of Foreign Affairs.

== See also ==
- Embassy of the People's Republic of China in Moscow

Diplomatic posts
Preceded by Lu Qiutian	Chinese Ambassador to Romania; 1996–1999	Succeeded by Chen Delai
Preceded by Zhang Deguang	Chinese Ambassador to Russia; 2003–2009	Succeeded by Li Hui
