= Joint Statement of the Leaders of the Five Nuclear-Weapon States on Preventing Nuclear War and Avoiding Arms Races =

January 2022 statement

Full text
- Joint Statement of the Leaders of the Five Nuclear-Weapon States on Preventing Nuclear War and Avoiding Arms Races at Wikisource

Joint Statement of the Leaders of the Five Nuclear-Weapon States on Preventing Nuclear War and Avoiding Arms Races is a joint statement about controlling the use of nuclear weapons, preventing nuclear war, and avoiding arms races, signed on January 3, 2022, by China, France, Russia, the United Kingdom, and the United States, the five NPT-designated nuclear-weapon states and permanent members of the United Nations Security Council.

== Reactions ==
United Nations Secretary-General António Guterres welcomed the joint statement. Ma Zhaoxu, vice-minister of Ministry of Foreign Affairs in China, said in a media interview that the joint statement, the first by the leaders of the five countries on nuclear weapons, reflects the political will of the five countries to prevent nuclear war and sends a common voice to maintain global strategic stability and reduce the risk of nuclear conflict.

== See also ==
- No first use
- Treaty on the Non-Proliferation of Nuclear Weapons
