= Political positions of Gennady Zyuganov =

Political and socioeconomic beliefs of Gennady Zyuganov

Gennady Zyuganov, a member of the State Duma since 1993, leader of the Communist Party and four-time Russian presidential candidate, has taken positions on many political issues through his public comments, his presidential campaign statements, and his voting record.

During the 1980s, Zyuganov was an ardent opponent of reforms introduced by Mikhail Gorbachev, such as glasnost and perestroika.

As leader of the Communist Party of the Russian Federation Zyuganov has been widely considered to be a nationalist.

== Constitutional reforms ==
In his earlier career, Zyuganov opposed strong executive authority. He held a position in which he evoked Lenin's slogan "all power to the soviets" in order to illustrate a desire for an executive branch subordinate to the legislature, as is the case in Great Britain. Zyuganov also proposed strengthening legislative control, particularly the role of the legislature in confirming cabinet members.

For his 1996 campaign, Zyuganov abandoned his previous stance on executive authority. Instead, Zyuganov adopted a new policy favoring a non-subordinate executive branch. While still rallying against "excessive" concentration of executive authority, Zyuganov now expressed his desire for the Russian president to have "twice" the power of the French president and "four times" that of the American president.

Zyuganov's Communist Party had earlier opposed a "strong presidency", and Zyuganov criticized the "excessive" concentration of executive power afforded by the constitution adopted by Russia in 1993. However, during his 1996 campaign, he advocated neither replacing the existing constitution by revolution or by calling a new constitutional convention. Instead, he desired to modify the existing constitution by amending it according to its rules. However, the political reality of achieving this made it relatively unlikely, as the constitution's amendment process is difficult.

In 1996 he sought to establish a strong central government.

In 1996 Zyuganov also sought to reestablish the office of Vice President and to make all governorships elected positions (as opposed to appointed positions).

However, on April 11, 1996, Gennadii Seleznev told Izvestiyaon that within a two or three year timeframe, Zyuganov (contrarily to his public stance) planned to dismantle the presidency. According to Seleznev, Zyuganov would transform Russia's government into a parliamentary system.

More recently, Zyuganov has proposed introducing regular referendums to give more power to the public.

== Economic policy ==
In his 1996 campaign Zyuganov admonished the ongoing decline of Russia's economy. Zyuganov promised that he would turn around Russia's economy. Zyuganov called for the reversal of such reforms as privatization of state-run industries and pledged to restore state control of the economy. He assured voters that a powerful state sector would serve its economy well. Much of Zyuganov's campaign focused on the decline of the general standard of living and of industrial production in Russia. Zyuganov promised that he would cure the nation's economic maladies by stimulating both agricultural and industrial production. He also promised that he would restore guaranteed employment and guaranteed pay.

In 1996, Zyuganov's Communist Party proposed reinstating the State Planning Committee. The party proposed that such a measure would allow the private sector to be strictly regulated, arguing that government intervention would boost industrial production.

During his 2012 campaign, Zyuganov pledged to stop Russia's economic decline by ushering a return to socialism.

=== Agriculture ===
During the 1995 legislative election, the Communist Party had aggressively courted the rural vote. In 1996, the Communists renewed much of their 1995 platform in regards to agricultural policy. This policy focused on the "scissors", the gap between the high input expenses in agriculture and the below-market prices that the state paid for crops. The Communists promised to end this by lowering the costs of inputs and protecting Russian crops from foreign competition.

In the speeches that he delivered to rural audiences during his 1996 campaign, Zyuganov criticized Russia's declining agricultural production. He also voiced outrage at the lack of state support for rural regions. Zyuganov went as far as claiming that, due to their outcome, policies neglecting rural areas of Russia qualified as acts of genocide.

Zyuganov strongly opposed the sale of agricultural land, but supported the awarding of lifetime leases of land.

Most other presidential candidates and parties in 1996 largely disregarded agricultural policy in their platforms. However, the Communist Party made it one of the main focuses of their platform.

During his 2012 campaign, Zyuganov advocated renationalizing the agricultural sector of Russia's economy.

=== Industry ===
In the 1996 campaign speeches that he delivered to urban audiences, Zyuganov criticized Russia's declining industrial production. Zyuganov expressed a particular interest in protecting the nation's military industries, declaring,

An urgent task is to save the countries scientific potential (including) state support to high-technology production facilities in the military–industrial complex.

In 1996, Zyuganov's Communist Party proposed that, instead of following the International Monetary Fund's program for the country to develop a free market economy, Russia would instead implement large government investments in industries as well as protective tariffs against foreign competition. They also called for export tariffs on oil and gas in order to procure government revenue.

In 1996, Zyuganov did not advocate nationalizing small industries. However, the Communist Party's platform did envision state ownership of infrastructure industries, such as energy, transportation, and communications. It also envisioned state ownership for other industries of strategic importance, such as the defense industry. Furthermore, the party's economic administrator at the time had expressed a desire to also nationalize the exporting metallurgy industry. In 1996, Zyuganov additionally promised to implement a state monopoly of the alcohol industry in order to increase federal revenues.

Zyuganov's 2000 platform similarly advocated for a "regulated market", in which the state would hold a controlling share in certain key sectors of the economy, such as the energy, transport and military industries. At the same time, in an adaption of trickle-down economics, Zyuganov proposed cutting taxes on domestic industry in half. He additionally proposed cuts to energy, transport and communications tariffs.

Zyuganov has continued to advocate the nationalization of major industries, such as oil and gas and other industries related to the extraction of natural resources. His main economic proposal was reportedly the nationalisation of Russia's natural resources, while his foreign policy aims include "increasing the role of the UN... and restricting the influence of Nato".

In his 2012 campaign platform, Zyuganov pledged to restore industries he believed were in "deep crisis", such as shipbuilding, the defense industry and agriculture. Additionally, in order to aid Russia's defense industry, he proposed implementing a complete ban on the mass purchase of foreign-made military equipment.

=== Ownership ===
During his 1996 campaign, Zyuganov, pledged to preserve a bulk of the forms of ownership of economic enterprises that had been allowed, including private ownership. However, as a communist, he expected that, "the leading role of socialist forms of ownership will clearly come to prominence".

Zyuganov spoke of reversing-course and reinstating government controls on the nation's economy. Zyuganov's Communist Party did not entirely oppose privatization. Instead, the party emphasized the importance of developing an economy with many different forms of ownership, including state, cooperative, and private ownership. Sweden, Austria and other Western European nations with mixed economies were pointed to as models to illustrate this vision.

During his 1996 campaign, Zyuganov discussed using implementing controls in lieu of state ownership of small enterprises. However, the Communist Party did envision state ownership of infrastructure industries, such as energy, transportation, and communications.

As is mentioned in the section on agriculture, Zyuganov was strongly opposed to the sale of agricultural land. However, he did support the awarding of lifetime leases of land. The Communist Party issued proposals in 1996 that would ban the ownership of land, with the exception of small garden plots.

In an interview given on May 12, 1996, Zyuganov tied socialist state-ownership with Russia's national character, saying,

What is determined by the national character is that since Peter the Great the Russian economy has always been run primarily by the state... It is no secret to anybody that we have a number of national traits: we are collectivists; we are community-spirited. That is how we are born, since the times of Christ.

Zyuganov's 1996 economic platform also focused on issues such as inequity and corruption that had arisen in the privatization process. Zyuganov pledged to overturn privatization that had taken place illegally.

In his trips abroad during his 1996 campaign, Zyuganov attempted to quell concerns that he would be hostile towards foreign investment. He would insist that he desired to maintain friendly business climate in Russia. In his February 1, New York Times op-ed, Zyuganov stated that he would pursue economic cooperation and exchanges with the west, but added,

"we insist on acknowledgment of our equal right to follow our own path in accordance with our traditions and conditions."

While Zyuganov would talk to foreign investors about economic reform and political pluralism, at his own campaign rallies he denounced capitalism.

While he and his party were not proposing an outright ban on foreign investments (and insisted they would welcome foreign investment), the Communist Party did propose legislation in 1996 that would severely limit the foreign-owned market share of the Russian economy. For instance, legislation was proposed to restrict foreign-made entertainment to make up no more than 20 percent of all television programming in Russia. Additionally, they proposed legislation which would ban foreign entities from purchasing ownership of Russian land, natural resources or energy complexes. Additionally, the legislation would have banned foreign entities from purchasing controlling interests in "key industries of the basic branches of the economy."

By 2000, Zyuganov remained steadfast in his opposition to private ownership of agricultural land. He also advocated instating a state monopoly on alcohol and tobacco.

In his 2012 campaign, Zyuganov again proposed renationalizing industries involving natural resource extraction. He also proposed renationalizing the agricultural and defense sectors of the nation's economy.

Zyuganov has alleged that Yeltsin dismantled the Congress of People's Deputies of Russia because he saw it as the final obstruction to, "thuggish privatization and stealing of the people’s property".

=== Retirement ===
In 2018, Zyuganov denounced government plans to raise the retirement age, and suggested for a referendum to be held on the matter.

=== Taxes ===
At the time of his 2000 presidential campaign, in an adaption of trickle-down economics, Zyuganov proposed cutting taxes on domestic industry in half.

Zyuganov has been a proponent of implementing a 20% tax on all capital outflows.

In his 2012 campaign, Zyuganov promised to lower most citizens' taxes by implementing a progressive taxation regime and to instituting new government price-control mechanisms on necessities.

=== Wages ===
At the time of his 2000 presidential campaign Zyuganov proposed increasing minimum wages. His proposed minimum wage increases would equal $500 per month for doctors and teachers and $450 for others, a significant increase from the existing minimum wage, which equaled just $300.

== Foreign policy ==
Zyuganov's foreign policy is strongly nationalist and anti-western.

On February 1, 1996, an op-ed authored by Zyuganov was published in The New York Times largely outlining Zyuganov's planned foreign policy. Zyuganov wrote,

"We would restore the might of the Russian state and its status in the world. That would make its policies incomparably more predictable and responsible than they are today.

Zyuganov's 1996 foreign policy statements included aspects that some observers believed resembled Gorbachev's early period of leadership. Zyuganov, however, argued that Russia's foreign policy should be void of ideological underpinnings and should instead be targeted and practical.

In 2000, Zyuganov expressed a belief that Russia held the, "unique role as the pivot and fulcrum" of a Eurasia that is destined to forever compete with the West.

During the 2011 legislative campaign, he declared that Russia needed to increase its number of allies in order to “counter the aggressive policies of imperialist circles.” This included rekindling ties with Ukraine and Belarus.

=== Agreements and treaties ===
During his 1996 campaign, Zyuganov declared his willingness to withdraw Russia from existing agreements, saying,

We will pursue an independent foreign policy in keeping with the interest of the Russian state and not shrink from dissolving unequal international treaties.

In the 2011 legislative election, Zyuganov promised to strengthen Russia's role on the world stage and to, "get rid of the dictate of 'global rules'."

=== China ===
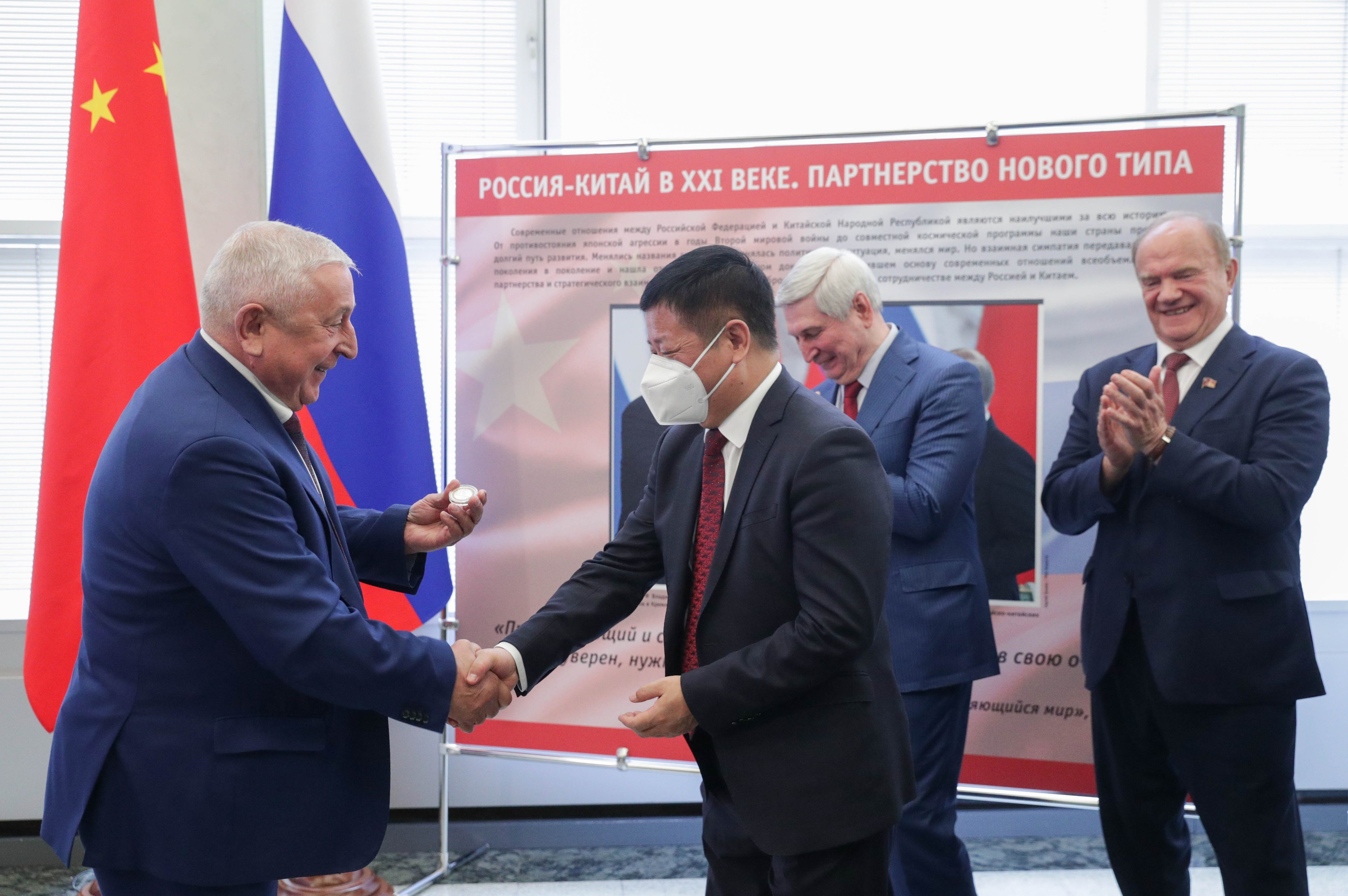
Zyuganov in the background of Nikolay Kharitonov meeting with Zhang Hanhui in June 2021

Gennady Zyuganov expressed that the Communist Party of the Russian Federation should learn from China's successful example and build Russian socialism. He also encouraged all party members to read "Selected works of Deng Xiaoping". He said during his visit to China in 2008: "Had we learnt from the success of China earlier, the Soviet Union would not have dissolved".

In May 2021, the far-right anti-communist political party All-Russian Political Party "Rodina" accused Zyuganov and the Communist Party of the Russian Federation of having received financial support from the Chinese Communist Party and by extension the People's Republic of China, saying that the CPRF leadership frequently travelled to China to give political speeches, that Zyuganov had three books published in China, and that Zyuganov's grandson, Leonid Zyuganov, was studying in China for an internship.

On 5 July 2021, Zyuganov attended a concert dedicated to the 100th Anniversary of the Chinese Communist Party in Moscow, and gave a speech.

=== Commonwealth of Independent States ===
During his 1996 presidential campaign, Zyuganov declared that he intended to pursue the voluntary reintegration of nations into a reestablished Commonwealth of Independent States. He declared his plans to pursue the initiation of negotiations to establish the organization. At the same time, Zyuganov postured that he considered Russia to be "part" of Europe.

=== European Union ===
In the 2010s, Zyuganov has blamed the United States for the inability of Russia to form a benevolent partnership with European nations. He has also accused the United States and the European Union of challenging Russia's right of sovereignty.

Zyuganov has opposed the prospect of Ukraine joining the European Union.

=== NATO ===
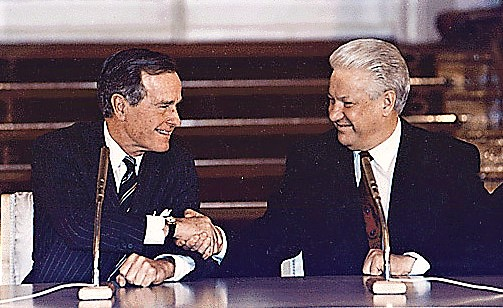
Zyuganov threatened to delay the implementation of the Start II treaty (signed by George H. W. Bush and Yeltsin) if NATO expansion were to occur.

During his 1996 presidential campaign, Zyuganov declared NATO expansion to be a dangerous proposition that conflicted with Russia's internal affairs. Zyuganov said that he would delay the implementation of START II if NATO expansion were to occur.

During the 2011 legislative election, Zyuganov declared that he continued to view NATO as a threat to Russia. In the 2012 presidential election, his foreign policy platform included and aim towards "restricting the influence of NATO".

Zyuganov has continued to characterize NATO as an aggressor.

=== Terrorism ===
Zyuganov has suggested that, in order to stop terrorism, it is necessary to bring an end to globalism.

Zyuganov blamed the United States for the January 2015 Île-de-France attacks in Paris, France and other acts of terrorism in Europe.

=== World Trade Organization ===
In his 2012 presidential campaign, Zyuganov advocated distancing Russia from the World Trade Organization.

=== Syria ===
Zyuganov has opposed Western involvement in Syria.

=== Ukraine ===
During the war in Donbas, Zyuganov accused the "Western partners" of both creating and taking advantage of instability in Ukraine. He has alleged that the 2014 election of Petro Poroshenko was fraudulent.

Zyuganov has vehemently opposed the prospect of Ukraine joining the European Union, arguing Ukraine would cease being a "neutral" nation if it joined the EU.

==== Russian invasion of Ukraine ====
Following the Russian invasion of Ukraine, the CPRF published a statement in support of the invasion and accused NATO of planning "to enslave Ukraine" and thus creating "critical threats to the security of Russia". It called for the "demilitarization and denazification" of Ukraine. The party framed the conflict as that between the Ukrainian banderites and fascists, who have been perpetrating genocide against Russian speakers, and liberating Russian forces. The CPRF also accused the United States and NATO of deploying European fascist sympathizers and Middle Eastern terrorists to Ukraine to fight the Russian army. Three members of CPRF's Duma caucus, Vyacheslav Markhaev, Mykhailo Matveev, and Oleg Smolin, have expressed opposition to the war thus far.

In February 2022, Zyuganov, who supported the 2022 Russian invasion of Ukraine was placed on the sanctions list by the United States, Canada, Japan, United Kingdom, Australia and the European Union.

In September 2022 Zyuganov (voicing his opinions on the Communist Party’s website), described an alleged need for a maximum mobilisation of Russia in its war effort against Ukraine, branding the conflict as a war against America, Europe and NATO.

=== United Nations ===
In his 2012 presidential campaign, Zyuganov called for the role of the United Nations to be strengthened.

=== United States ===
In his 1996 campaign, Zyuganov asserted that Russia never could serve as a "junior partner" to the United States. Zyuganov also asserted that the United States should not aspire to be the world's sole superpower.

Zyguanov has blamed the United States for the collapse of the Soviet Union. Amongst other things, Zyuganov has also accused the United States of supporting international terrorism and of challenging the sovereignty of Russia.

== Military policy ==
In speeches during his 1996 campaign, Zyuganov decried what he alleged to be the total destruction of the Soviet military-industrial complex. Zyuganov promised to rebuild Russia's military powers, declaring, "The army needs reforming —and not only organizationally and militarily—technically."

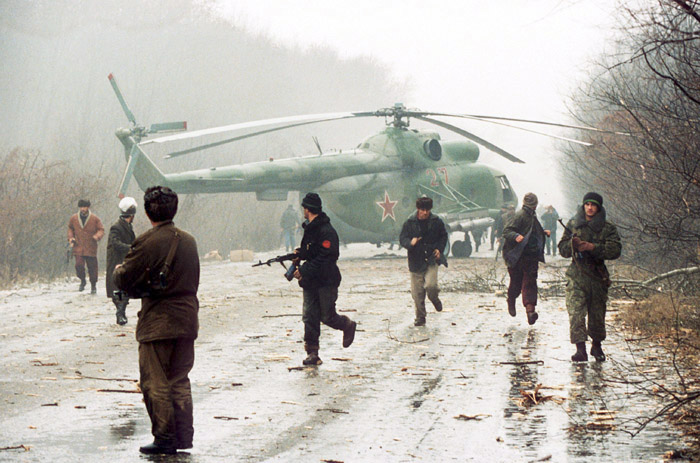
Zyuganov criticized Yeltsin as being responsible for the ongoing First Chechen War

To counter claims by Yeltsin's campaign that a Zyuganov presidency would likely bring a civil war, Zyuganov noted that Yeltsin's leadership had instigated a war in Chechnya. Zyuganov claimed that the Chechen conflict had the potential to spread throughout the rest of the country.

At the time of his 2000 presidential campaign Zyuganov agreed with Putin's handling of the Second Chechen War

During his 2012 campaign, Zyuganov stated that if elected president he would fire Minister of Defense Anatoliy Serdyukov. He would also undo many of the 2008 reforms introduced by Serdyukov. This would include reverting Serdyukov's downsizing of Russia's military education. He additionally promised to solve social problems found within the military, such as hazing.

== Social policy ==
During his 1996 campaign, Zyuganov's overall vision for Russia's future was of a socialist society. A nation where citizens were to be provided with "cradle-to-grave" socialist care. Zyuganov vowed to enlarge the country's social safety nets, and proposed a broad socialist program. Zyuganov, and his political party, rejected the label of social democratic. Zyuganov stated, "In Russia, social democracy of the West European type has no chance." Consequentially, his campaign platform eschewed many social democratic principles.

In his 2000 campaign Zyuganov continued to advocate for a significant expansion to Russia's social safety net.

In 2011, speaking of resolving discord among ethnic, social, and wealth groups in Russia, Zyuganov declared, “It is our responsibility to build up relations so that there will be true friendship between peoples." He added, “Russians have found themselves in the most demeaning of positions. And that is while Russian culture, language, and traditions could provide a basis for integrity. That includes an ability to live together (with other nations), get on well, without destroying even a single language, culture or religion.”

During his 2012 campaign Zyuganov declared his belief that, in order to solve problems in Chechnya, Russia needed to, "return to the Soviet experience of building interethnic and socio-economic relations in the Caucasus and then the main problems of the region will be solved."

=== LGBT rights ===
Zyuganov has stated that Homosexuality is contrary to Russian national traditions. In 2013, Zyuganov supported the Russian gay propaganda law, which prohibits the depiction of homosexual relationships in society and enforces heteronormativity.

=== Media censorship ===
Zyuganov has at various times proposed censorship of foreign films and advertisements, as well as measures that would reduce the amount of television programming showing murder, money and pornography.

In 1996, legislation was proposed by the Communist Party that would restrict foreign-made entertainment to make up no more than 20 percent of all television programming in Russia.

=== Death penalty ===
Zyuganov supports the death penalty. He called for its return in 2006 and 2010.

=== Religion ===
According to Zyuganov, Jesus Christ was the first communist, claiming the Bible may be read through a socialist perspective. Zyuganov also stated that Communism does not need to antagonize the Christian Orthodox Church.

Zyuganov, numerous times, during his 1996 campaign spoke of his appreciation for the Russian Orthodox Church, seeking to earn the vote of religious voters. In his first campaign visit to Siberia, Zyuganov proclaimed that he, "like Josef Stalin", had great respect for the Russian Orthodox Church.

==== Antisemitism ====
As early as 1996 Zyuganov was accused of turning a blind-eye to antisemitism among his supporters.

In December 1998 Zyuganov wrote an open-letter alleging of a "Zionist conspiracy to seize power in Russia", and of a "Zionist" plot to dominate the world. Zyuganov insisted that these allegations were not aimed at attacking Jews. However, the allegations he made belong to common antisemitic canard. In the same letter, Zyuganov also assailed Jewish financiers. Around the same time, following heavily antisemitic remarks by Albert Makashov, Zyuganov found himself under pressure to publicly censure him for his statements. Zyuganov ultimately did issue a statement denouncing anti-Semitism, but at the same time labeled Zionism "a blood relative of fascism". However, he defended Mashakov's statements as, "a tough response to the destructive actions of forces that have occupied our country."

== Other policy ==
=== Changing the national flag ===
Zyuganov vowed to hold a referendum on replacing the Russian tricolour with the former Soviet flag. Zyuganov claimed that the tri-coloured flag had been used by Russian collaborators who fought alongside Nazi Germany against the Red Army in World War II.

=== Multi-partisan character of government ===
In 1996, Zyuganov had pledged that, if elected, his presidential administration would not be a narrow communist-party based one. Rather, he promised that he intended to offer positions in his presidential ministry to presidential candidates such as Yavlinsky, Lebed and Fedorov, and to offer other non-communist politicians roles in his government.

Zyuganov also assured that non-communist government employees were not at risk of losing their jobs. Similarly, when he was planning to run in 2018, Zyuganov promised that he would retain (and even promote) members of the government bureaucracy who were honest and uncorrupted.

=== Re-Stalinization ===
In the 2010s, Zyuganov has advocated for a re-Stalinization of Russia. In particular, he wrote an open letter to then-president Dmitry Medvedev in 2010 advocating this.
