= Sun Weidong =

Chinese diplomat (born 1966)

- 孙卫东
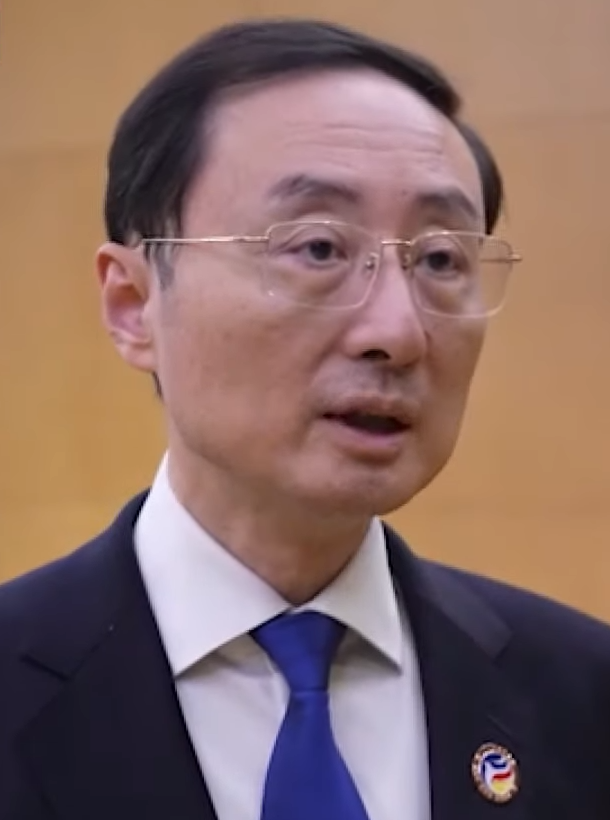
- Sun in 2024

Vice Minister of Foreign Affairs
- In office 15 November 2022 – 14 April 2026 Serving with Ma Zhaoxu, Deng Li, Hua Chunying
- Minister: Wang Yi; Qin Gang; Wang Yi

Chinese Ambassador to India
- In office July 2019 – October 2022
- Preceded by: Luo Zhaohui
- Succeeded by: Xu Feihong

Chinese Ambassador to Pakistan
- In office June 2013 – October 2017
- Preceded by: Liu Jian
- Succeeded by: Yao Jing

Personal details
- Born: September 1966 (age 59) Xuzhou, Jiangsu, China
- Party: Chinese Communist Party
- Spouse: Bao Jiqing
- Children: 1

Chinese name
- Traditional Chinese: 孫衛東
- Simplified Chinese: 孙卫东
Transcriptions
Standard Mandarin
- Hanyu Pinyin: Sūn Wèidōng

Sun Weidong (Chinese: 孙卫东; born September 1966) is a Chinese diplomat who served as vice minister of foreign affairs from 15 November 2022 to 14 April 2026. Sun previously served as Chinese Ambassador to Pakistan from 2013 to 2017, and to India from 2019 to 2022.

== Early life ==
Sun Weidong was born at a town in Xuzhou Prefecture in September 1966. From 1989 to 1996 he taught at China Foreign Affairs University.

== Diplomatic career ==
He joined the Foreign Service in 1996 and has served primarily in Southeast Asia. From 2005 to 2008 he was counsellor of Chinese Embassy in India. After returning to China he was appointed deputy director of Asia Department of the Ministry of Foreign Affairs. He served as the Chinese Ambassador to Pakistan from 2013 through 2017. Then he was director of the Department of Policy Planning of the Ministry of Foreign Affairs.

=== Ambassador to India (2019–2022) ===
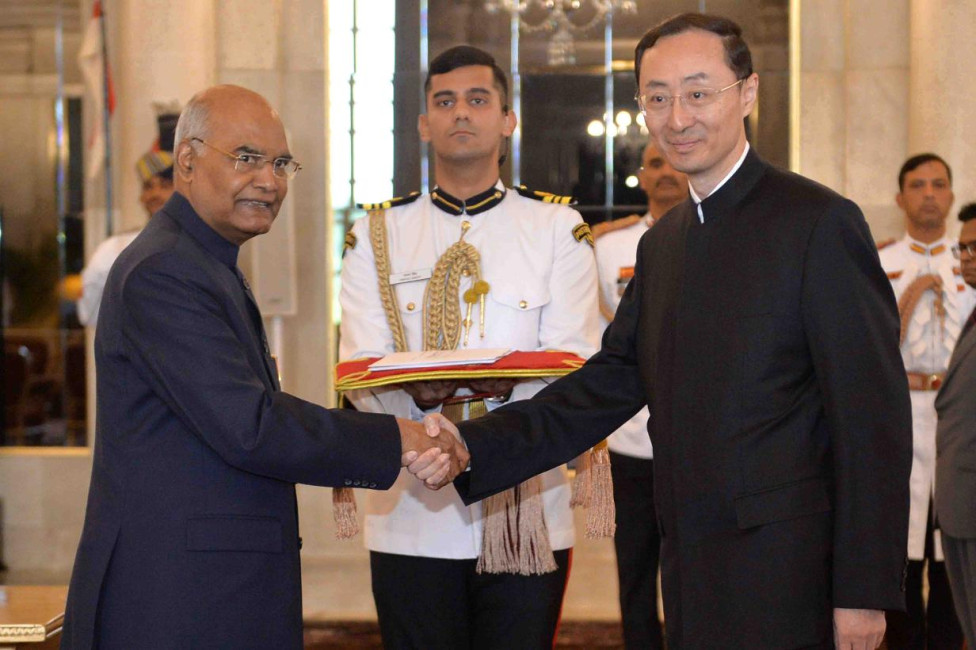
Sun presenting his credentials to President of India Ram Nath Kovind (2019)

In 2019, the 13th Standing Committee of the National People's Congress appointed him Chinese Ambassador to India, replacing Luo Zhaohui. On 28 August 2019, he along with ambassadors of three other countries presented their credentials to President of India Ram Nath Kovind.

Sun's tenure as ambassador witnessed the worsening of relations between China and India following the border skirmishes between Indian and Chinese troops in June 2020 near Galwan Valley, resulting in the deaths of 20 Indian and four Chinese soldiers. In the aftermath of the border clashes, the Government of India banned 59 Chinese mobile apps and placed restrictions on Chinese economic investments in India. In an interview with the Press Trust of India on 25 June 2020, Sun stated that "mutual respect and support is a sure way and meets the long-term interests of both countries; suspicion and friction is a wrong path and goes against the fundamental aspiration of the two peoples" and then proceeded to blame the Indian side for instigating the border clash stating the onus to resolve border tensions was not on China.

During the second wave of COVID-19 pandemic in India in 2021 when China provided medical equipment to India, Sun stated that "China was not absent or sat back apathetically" which was seen as a dig towards the United States who was a key partner of India but was slow in reaching out during the second wave of the pandemic. Sun served this position till October 2022. During his farewell ceremony, he stated that "if the western theory of geopolitics is applied to China-India relationship, then major neighbouring countries like us will inevitably view each other as threats and rivals" which was seen as a cautionary remark against the West. While at the same time, he stated that "when China and India maintain stability and development, it means that two-fifths of the world’s population has access to development opportunities. The healthy development of China-India relations will bring more stability and certainty to the world."

=== Vice Minister of Foreign Affairs (2022–2026) ===
On 15 November 2022, he was appointed vice-minister of Foreign Affairs. In May 2023, he summoned then Japanese ambassador to China Hideo Tarumi to protest after the heads of state at 49th G7 summit in Hiroshima issued statement regarding rising tensions in South China Sea and Taiwan Strait as well as the human rights situations in China, including in Tibet and Xinjiang. That same month in a meeting in Beijing, he warned Cagayan governor Manuel Mamba on hosting foreign troops such as the United States in the Philippines. He also reiterated that China preferred a bilateral approach to handle maritime disputes. In January 2024, he visited North Korea where he met with Minister of Foreign Affairs of North Korea Choe Son-hui. During his meeting with Choe, both China and North Korea pledged to strengthen strategic communications "at all levels" and reaffirmed "unswerving stance" on deepening ties. In June 2024, he met with First Deputy Foreign Minister of Ukraine Andrii Sybiha and during the meeting, Sybiha urged China to send delegation to the June 2024 Ukraine peace summit in Switzerland from June 15 to June 16. In a transcript of the meeting released by the Ministry of Foreign Affairs of China stated the two sides "exchanged views on the Ukrainian crisis and international and regional issues of common concern" but made no mention of Sybiha's request for China to attend the summit. In November 2025, amidst a diplomatic crisis with Japan, Sun summoned Japanese ambassador to China Kenji Kanasugi to protest remarks made by Japanese Prime Minister Sanae Takaichi about Japanese involvement in a war over Taiwan. Sun stated that "The Taiwan issue is the core of China’s core interests and is a red line that must not be crossed" and "if anyone attempts to interfere with the great cause of China’s reunification, China will inevitably strike back." On 14 April 2026, he was dismissed as Vice Minister of Foreign Affairs.

== Personal life ==
Sun is married to Bao Jiqing (包吉氢), who is a distinguished researcher at the Center for South Asian Studies in Institute of International Relations at Tsinghua University, and worked as a teaching assistant and lecturer at the English Department of China Foreign Affairs University from 1991 to 2001. The couple have a daughter.

== Foreign honors ==
- Pakistan: Hilal-e-Pakistan (October 2017)

Diplomatic posts
Preceded by Liu Jian	Chinese Ambassador to Pakistan; 2013–2017	Succeeded by Yao Jing
Preceded by Luo Zhaohui	Chinese Ambassador to India; 2019–2022	Succeeded by Xu Feihong
