= Zheng Qingdian =

Chinese diplomat

Zheng Qingdian (Chinese: 郑清典) (born December 1952) was a Chinese diplomat. He was born in Changsha, Hunan. He was Ambassador of the People's Republic of China to Bangladesh (2007–2009), Afghanistan (2009–2011) and Jamaica (2011–2013).

Preceded by	Ambassador of China to Bangladesh; 2007–2009	Succeeded by
Preceded by Yang Houlan	Ambassador of China to Afghanistan; 2009–2011	Succeeded by Xu Feihong
Preceded by Chen Jinghua	Ambassador of China to Jamaica; 2011–2013	Succeeded by Dong Xiaojun
