= List of ambassadors of China to India =

Ambassador of China to India
- National Emblem of China

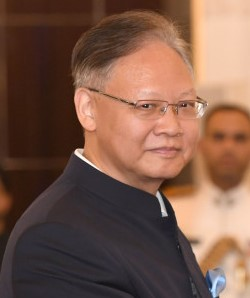
- Incumbent; Xu Feihong since May 2024
- Appointer: The president pursuant to a National People's Congress Standing Committee decision
- Inaugural holder: Xue Shouheng
- Formation: October 1946; 79 years ago

The ambassador of China to India is the official representative from the People's Republic of China to the Republic of India.

== List of representatives ==
This is a list of diplomatic representatives from China to India. It includes envoys of the Republic of China (ROC) from 1946 to 1950, and those of the People's Republic of China (PRC) since 1950.

Pinyin name (alternative name)	Chinese name	Title	Took office	Left office	Premier of China	Prime Minister of India	Source
Xue Shouheng	薛寿衡	First Secretary	October 1946	May 1947	Zhang Qun	Jawaharlal Nehru	
Luo Jialun	羅家倫	Ambassador	5 May 1947	10 January 1950	Zhang Qun	Jawaharlal Nehru	
Shen Jian	申健	Chargé d'affaires	27 May 1950	September 1950	Zhou Enlai	Jawaharlal Nehru	
Yuan Zhongxian	袁仲賢	Ambassador	September 1950	February 1956	Zhou Enlai	Jawaharlal Nehru	
Pan Zili	潘自力	Ambassador	9 March 1956	18 July 1962	Zhou Enlai	Jawaharlal Nehru	
Ye Chengzhang	叶成章 '	Chargé d'affaires	1962	1963	Zhou Enlai	Jawaharlal Nehru	
Chen Zhaoyuan	陈肇源	Chargé d'affaires	1963	1969	Zhou Enlai	Jawaharlal Nehru; Lal Bahadur Shastri; Gulzarilal Nanda; Indira Gandhi	(Note: Witness and victim of 1967 storming of the Chinese embassy in India)
Huang Mingda	黄明达	Chargé d'affaires	1970	1971	Zhou Enlai	Indira Gandhi	
Liu Fangpu	刘芳圃	First Secretary	1972	1972	Zhou Enlai	Indira Gandhi	
Ma Muming	马牧鸣	Chargé d'affaires	1973	1976	Zhou Enlai; Hua Guofeng	Indira Gandhi	
Chen Zhaoyuan	陈肇源	Ambassador	10 September 1976	1 December 1979	Hua Guofeng	Indira Gandhi; Morarji Desai; Charan Singh	
Shen Jian	申健	Ambassador	4 March 1980	11 July 1984	Hua Guofeng; Zhao Ziyang	Indira Gandhi	
Li Lianqing	李连庆	Ambassador	30 November 1984	1 April 1987	Zhao Ziyang	Rajiv Gandhi	
Tu Guowei	屠国维	Ambassador	28 July 1987	1 August 1991	Zhao Ziyang; Li Peng	Rajiv Gandhi; V.P. Singh; Chandra Shekhar; P. V. Narasimha Rao	
Cheng Ruisheng	程瑞声	Ambassador	19 September 1991	1 November 1994	Li Peng	P. V. Narasimha Rao	
Pei Yuanying	裴远颖	Ambassador	2 January 1995	1 March 1998	Li Peng; Zhu Rongji	P. V. Narasimha Rao; Atal Bihari Vajpayee; H. D. Deve Gowda; Inder Kumar Gujral	
Zhou Gang	周剛	Ambassador	16 April 1998	1 June 2001	Zhu Rongji	Atal Bihari Vajpayee	
Hua Junduo	華君鐸	Ambassador	12 September 2001	1 November 2004	Zhu Rongji; Wen Jiabao	Atal Bihari Vajpayee; Manmohan Singh	
Sun Yuxi	施肇基	Ambassador	17 January 2005	1 December 2007	Wen Jiabao	Manmohan Singh	
Zhang Yan	張炎	Ambassador	25 March 2008	1 October 2012	Wen Jiabao	Manmohan Singh	
Wei Wei	魏苇	Ambassador	6 January 2013	1 August 2014	Wen Jiabao; Li Keqiang	Manmohan Singh; Narendra Modi	
Le Yucheng	乐玉成	Ambassador	12 September 2014	1 April 2016	Li Keqiang	Narendra Modi	
Luo Zhaohui	罗照辉	Ambassador	27 September 2016	1 May 2019	Li Keqiang	Narendra Modi	
Sun Weidong	孙卫东	Ambassador	21 July 2019	October 2022	Li Keqiang	Narendra Modi	
Xu Feihong	徐飞洪	Ambassador	May 2024	Incumbent	Li Qiang	Narendra Modi	

== See also ==
- Embassy of China, New Delhi
