= List of ambassadors of China to Kazakhstan =

Coordinates: 51.121515°N 71.410911°E

Ambassador of China to Kazakhstan
- National emblem of China
- Incumbent; Zhang Xiao since August 2018
- Inaugural holder: Zhang Deguang
- Formation: April 1992; 34 years ago

The ambassador of China to Kazakhstan is the official representative of the People's Republic of China to the Republic of Kazakhstan.

== List of representatives ==
Diplomatic agrément/Diplomatic accreditation	Ambassador	Chinese language zh:中国驻哈萨克斯坦大使列表	Observations	Premier of the People's Republic of China	Prime Minister of Kazakhstan	Term end
April 1992	Zhang Deguang	zh:张德广		Li Peng	Sergey Tereshchenko	August 1993
September 1993	Chen Di (diplomat)	zh:陈棣	From February 1992 to January 1995 was ambassador to Latvia and Estonia; From September 1993 to July 1997 he was ambassador to Kazakhstan.; From March 1998 to October 2000 was ambassador in Poland	Li Peng	Sergey Tereshchenko	July 1997
August 1997	Li Hui (diplomat)	zh:李辉 (外交官)		Li Peng	Nurlan Balgimbayev	March 2000
March 2003	Yao Peisheng	zh:姚培生		Wen Jiabao	Daniyal Akhmetov	September 2003
September 2003	Zhou Xiaopei	zh:周晓沛		Wen Jiabao	Daniyal Akhmetov	October 2005
November 2005	Zhang Xiyun	zh:张喜云	From 1997 - 2000 he was Minister Counselor of the Embassy in Russian Moscow.; From 2000 to February 2002, he was Minister of the Embassy in Moscow; From (February 2002 - 2005 November 2005 was ambassador to Azerbaijan.; From November 2005 to September 2008 he was ambassador to Kazakhstan.; From October 2006 to July 2010 he was Secretary of the Ministry of Foreign Affairs of Eurasia.; From July 2010 to June 2016 was ambassador in Kyiv (Ukraine)	Wen Jiabao	Daniyal Akhmetov	September 2008
September 2008	Cheng Guoping	zh:程国平	Born May 1952 in Hubei	Wen Jiabao	Karim Massimov	February 2010
May 2010	Zhou Li (diplomat)	zh:周力		Wen Jiabao	Karim Massimov	August 2013
August 2013	Le Yucheng	zh:乐玉成	(June 1963 in Yangzhou): From August 2013 to December 2014 he was ambassador to Kazakhstan.; In August 2014, he was appointed Ambassador in New Delhi (India).	Li Keqiang	Serik Akhmetov	December 2014
December 2014	Zhang Hanhui	zh:张汉晖	Born October 1963 in the province of Liaoning	Li Keqiang	Karim Massimov	April 2018
August 2018	Zhang Xiao	zh:张霄		Li Keqiang	Bakhytzhan Sagintayev	
