= Embassy of China, New Delhi =

Diplomatic mission in India

- Location: New Delhi, India
- Address: 50-D, Shantipath, Chanakyapuri, New Delhi, Delhi 110021
- Coordinates: 28.600°N 77.190°E
- Ambassador: Xu Feihong
- Jurisdiction: Bhutan; India
- Website: Official website

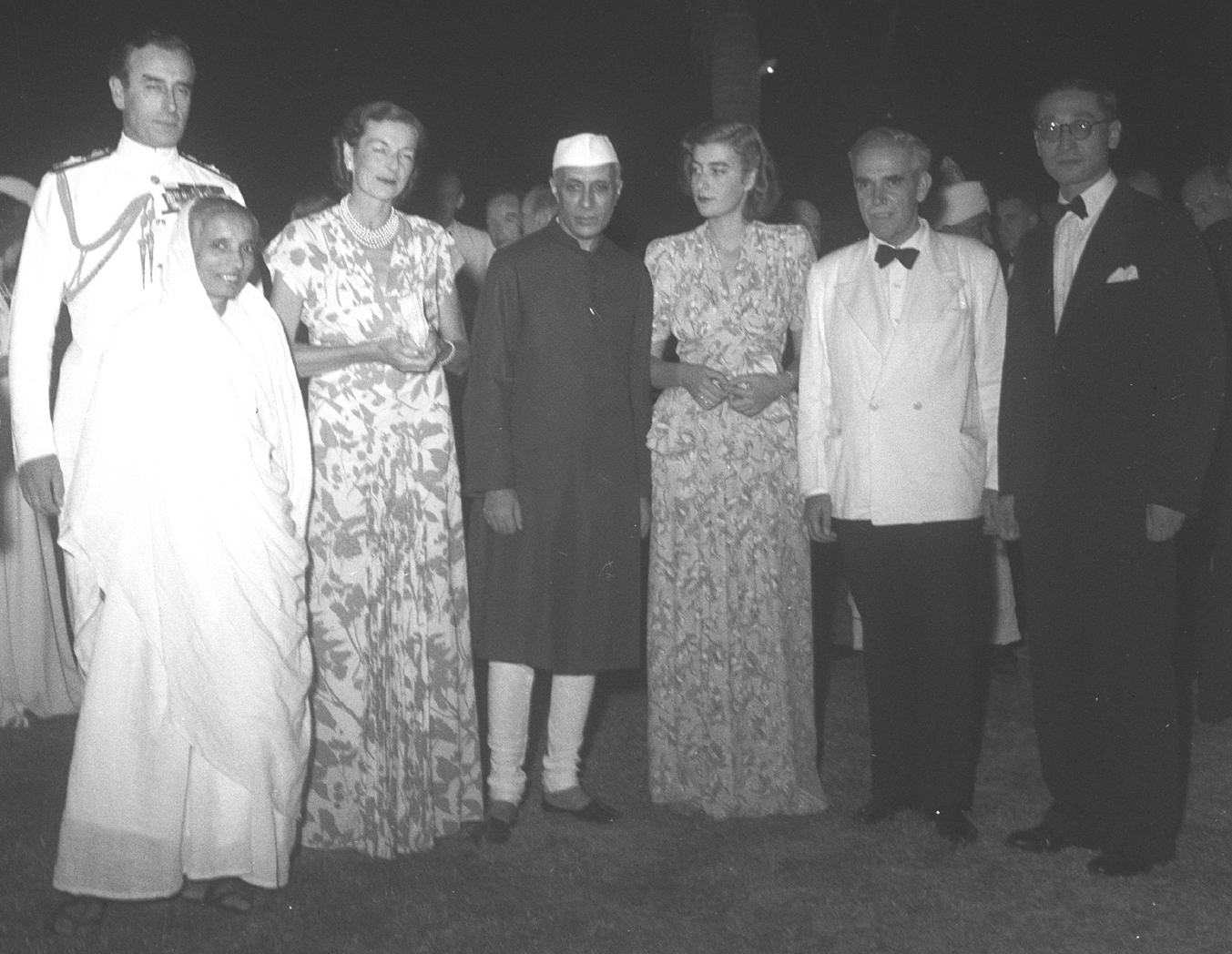
Photograph taken at the reception given at the Chinese Embassy on 10 October 1947, the anniversary of the Chinese Republic. (L to R) Louis Mountbatten, Maniben Patel, Edwina Mountbatten, Jawaharlal Nehru, Pamela Mountbatten Eugène, Prince of Ligne, the then Belgian Ambassador to India and Dr. Tsien Chinese Charge d' Affaires.

Embassy of the People's Republic of China in New Delhi is the diplomatic mission of the People's Republic of China to India. It is located at 50-D, Shantipath, Chanakyapuri, in New Delhi. The embassy also operates Consulates-General in Kolkata and Mumbai while the Consulate in Chennai is under construction. As of 2023, the chargé d'affaires at the embassy is Ma Jia.

== Protests ==
On 4 February 2022, Tibetans-in-exile protested outside the embassy with regard to the start of the Beijing Winter Olympics 2022. A few protestors who breached security barriers were detained.

== Chinese Consulate-Generals ==
- Chinese Consulate-General, Kolkata
- Chinese Consulate-General, Mumbai
- Chinese Consulate-General, Chennai (under construction)

== See also ==
- China–India relations
- List of diplomatic missions of China
- List of diplomatic missions in China
- List of diplomatic missions in India
- List of diplomatic missions of India
- List of ambassadors of China to India
- Foreign relations: China | India
