= Druzhby Street =

Street in Moscow, Russia

Coordinates: 55.7103°N 37.5170°E

Druzhby Street (Russian: у́лица Дру́жбы, romanised: úlitsa Drúzhby) is a street in Ramenki District, West Administrative District, Moscow. The name literally means the street of friendship and apparently commemorates the good moments in the Soviet-Chinese ties, and now China-Russia relations, since the embassy of the People's Republic of China is a major landmark of the street.

== Lay-out ==
Druzhby Street is a short street running from Universitetsky Prospekt to Lomonosovsky Prospekt, perpendicular to each.

== Notable buildings ==
- 6 - Embassy of the People's Republic of China

== Image gallery ==
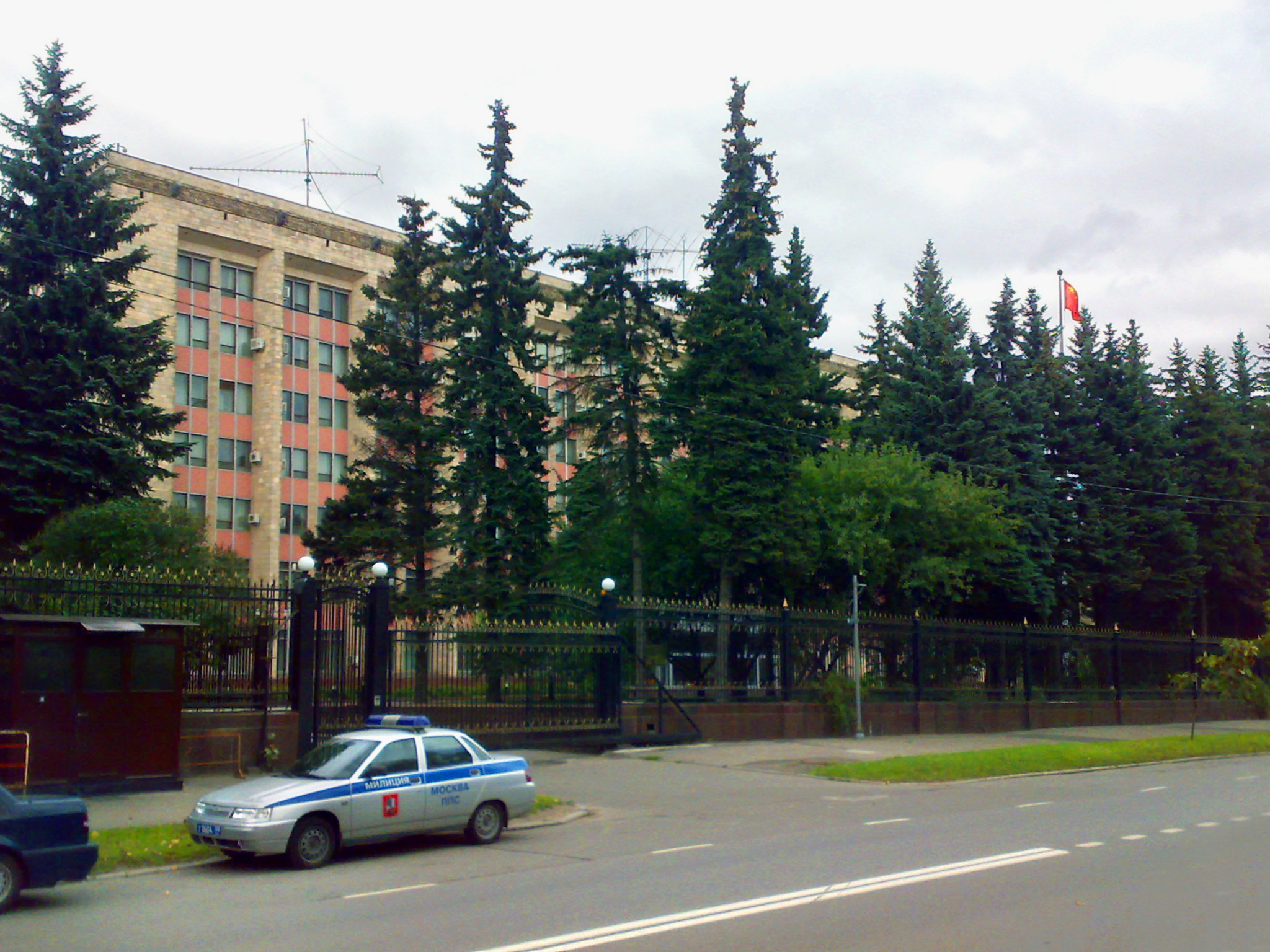
Embassy of the People's Republic of China
