= List of ambassadors of China to Russia =

Ambassador Extraordinary and Plenipotentiary of the People’s Republic of China to the Russian Federation
- 中华人民共和国驻俄罗斯联邦特命全权大使
- Emblem of the People's Republic of China

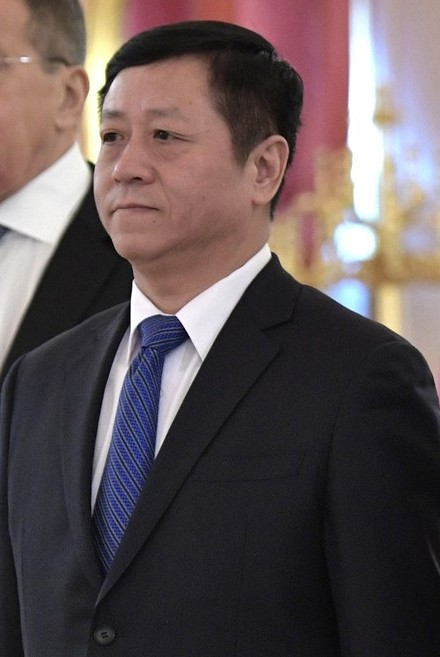
- Incumbent; Zhang Hanhui since 12 September 2019
- Ministry of Foreign Affairs
- Residence: Moscow
- Nominator: Standing Committee of the National People's Congress
- Appointer: President of China
- Website: Embassy of China in Russia

This is a list of ambassadors appointed by the Chinese government to represent it to the Soviet and Russian governments. Since China sent its first representative to Russia in 1878 under the Qing Dynasty, the government of both countries have changed multiple times through revolution, collapse of the previous state and civil war. This list does not include representatives of the Republic of China, commonly known as Taiwan, to Russia after its official relations with the Soviet Union ended on October 2, 1949.

The current iteration of the post is Ambassador Extraordinary and Plenipotentiary of the People's Republic of China to the Russian Federation. Zhang Hanhui has held the post of Chinese ambassador to Russia since he presented his letter of credence to Russian President Vladimir Putin on February 5, 2020.

== Envoys of the Qing Empire to the Russian Empire (1878–1912) ==
The Qing Empire began to send an Envoy Extraordinary and Minister Plenipotentiary to Russia in 1878. Chonghou, the first envoy, left Russia for China without permission and was replaced by Shao Yu-lien, who was consul at the Chinese embassy in Russia. On February 17, 1902, Yang Yu became the only Qing envoy to Russia to have died in office. China appointed Luo Fenglu to become its envoy on August 29, 1901, but the appointment was rejected by Russia.

No. (Note: Acting envoys are not numbered.)	Portrait	Name	Title	Appointment	Arrival	Presentation	Termination	Departure
1		Chonghou (崇厚)	Envoy	June 22, 1878	December 31, 1878	January 20, 1879	January 17, 1880	October 11, 1879
1		Chonghou (崇厚)	Ambassador	August 19, 1878	December 31, 1878	January 20, 1879	January 17, 1880	October 11, 1879
		Shao Yu-lien (邵友濂)	Chargé d'affaires ad interim	October 22, 1879	October 22, 1879		July 30, 1880	
2		Tseng Chi-tse (曾紀澤)	Envoy	February 12, 1880	July 30, 1880	August 22, 1880	August 17, 1886	
3		Liu Jui-fen (劉瑞芬)	Envoy	July 27, 1885	August 17, 1886	August 29, 1886	January 4, 1888	
4		Hung Chun (洪鈞)	Envoy	June 23, 1887	January 4, 1888		February 25, 1891	
5		Hsu Ching-cheng (許景澄)	Envoy	September 9, 1890	February 23, 1891	March 2, 1891	December 30, 1896	May 28, 1897
6		Yang Yu (楊儒)	Envoy	November 23, 1896			February 17, 1902	Died in office
7		Hu Weide (胡惟德)	Chargé d'affaires ad interim	February 20, 1902	February 20, 1902		July 12, 1902	
7		Hu Weide (胡惟德)	Envoy	July 12, 1902	July 12, 1902	January 14, 1903	October 7, 1907	
		Liu Ching-jen (劉鏡人)	Chargé d'affaires ad interim		October 7, 1907		January 26, 1908	
8		Sayintu (薩蔭圖)	Envoy	September 23, 1907	January 26, 1908	February 4, 1908	September 14, 1909	
		Tang Zaifu (唐在復)	Chargé d'affaires ad interim		September 22, 1911		November 21, 1911	
9		Lou Tseng-tsiang (陸徵祥)	Envoy	September 6, 1911	November 21, 1911	Did not present	February 1912	

== Envoys of the Republic of China to the Russian Empire (1912–1918) ==
The Republic of China was established in 1912. The Russian Empire recognized the Republic of China on October 6, 1913, and the Lou Tseng-tsiang continued his role as the envoy to Russia for the new republic. After the October Revolution, China's mission to Russia was withdrawn in February 1918, and diplomatic relations were halted.

No.	Portrait	Name	Title	Appointment	Arrival	Presentation	Termination	Departure
1		Lou Tseng-tsiang (陸徵祥)	Representative	February 1912		March 30, 1912		
		Zheng Yanxi (鄭延禧)	Chargé d'affaires ad interim	April 1912				November 4, 1912
2		Liu Ching-jen (劉鏡人)	Envoy	September 16, 1912	November 4, 1912			February 26, 1918

== Representative of the Republic of China to the Soviet Union (1923–1949) ==
Under the Beiyang government, China established a representative office in the Soviet Union in October 1923. On May 31, 1924, diplomatic relations were restored.

No.	Portrait	Name	Title	Appointment	Arrival	Presentation	Termination	Departure
1		Li Jiaao (李家鏊)	Envoy	October 6, 1923	February 6, 1924		August 29, 1925	November 13, 1925
2		Sun Baoqi (孫寶琦)	Ambassador	August 30, 1925	Did not arrive			
		Zheng Yanxi (鄭延禧)	Chargé d'affaires ad interim	August 18, 1925	November 13, 1925		October 27, 1928	
		Liao Shigong (廖世功)	Chargé d'affaires ad interim	October 27, 1928	November 5, 1928			April 1, 1929
		Zhu Shaoyang (朱紹陽)	Chargé d'affaires ad interim	March 30, 1929	April 1, 1929			May 3, 1929
		Xia Weisong (夏維崧)	Chargé d'affaires ad interim	April 20, 1929	May 3, 1929		July 24, 1929	
The Beiyang government collapsed in 1928 after the Northern Expedition and replaced by the Nationalist government in Nanjing. The Soviet Union broke ties with China on July 23, 1929, and relations were not restored until December 12, 1932.
3		Yan Huiqing (顏惠慶)	Ambassador	January 6, 1933	March 8, 1933	March 9, 1933	August 26, 1936	March 23, 1936
		Wu Nanru (吳南如)	Chargé d'affaires ad interim		March 23, 1936			November 7, 1936
4		Tsiang Tingfu (蔣廷黼)	Ambassador	August 26, 1936	November 7, 1936	November 11, 1936	May 12, 1938	January 18, 1938
		Yu Ming (余銘)	Chargé d'affaires ad interim	December 23, 1937	January 18, 1938			June 1, 1938
5		Yang Jie (楊杰)	Ambassador	May 12, 1938	June 1, 1938	September 4, 1938	April 18, 1940	January 13, 1940
6		Shao Lizi (邵力子)	Ambassador	April 18, 1940	June 7, 1940	June 11, 1940	January 15, 1943	October 27, 1942
7		Fu Bingchang (傅秉常)	Ambassador	January 15, 1943	February 24, 1943	March 8, 1943		October 11, 1949

== Ambassadors of the People's Republic of China to the Soviet Union (1949–1991) ==
No.	Portrait	Name	Tenure begins	Tenure ends
1		Wang Jiaxiang (王稼祥)	October 4, 1949	February 1951
2		Zhang Wentian (张闻天)	March 21, 1951	January 1955
3		Liu Xiao (刘晓)	January 13, 1955	October 24, 1962
4		Pan Zili (潘自力)	November 23, 1962	May 1966
5		Zhang Dequn (张德群)	May 1966	1966
6		An Zhiyuan (安致远)	1966	November 1970
7		Liu Xinquan (刘新权)	November 1970	March 2, 1976
8		Li Yaowen (李耀文)	March 1976	April 1977
9		Wang Youping (王幼平)	August 1977	July 1979
10		Yang Shouzheng (杨守正)	April 1980	January 22, 1985
11		Li Zewang (李则望)	February 1985	July 1987
12		Yu Hongliang (于洪亮)	August 13, 1987	November 1991
13		Wang Jinqing (王荩卿)	November 6, 1991	December 27, 1991

== Ambassadors to Russia (since 1991) ==
The Chinese foreign ministry declared recognized the Russian Federation on December 27, 1991, after the dissolution of the Soviet Union two days before. Wang Jinqing, who had been Ambassador to the Soviet Union, was appointed the first Chinese ambassador to post-Soviet Russia.

No.	Portrait	Name	Title	Appointment	Arrival	Presentation	Termination	Departure
1		Wang Jinqing (王荩卿)	Ambassador	December 27, 1991	December 5, 1991	February 4, 1992	June 19, 1995	June 1995
2		Li Fenglin (李凤林)	Ambassador	June 19, 1995	June 1995		September 17, 1998	September 1998
3		Wu Tao (武韬)	Ambassador	September 17, 1998	September 1998	December 15, 1998	August 8, 2001	July 2001
4		Zhang Deguang (张德广)	Ambassador	August 8, 2001	July 2001	August 27, 2001	November 18, 2003	October 2003
5		Liu Guchang (刘古昌)	Ambassador	November 18, 2003	November 14, 2003	January 22, 2004	August 13, 2009	July 2009
6		Li Hui (李辉)	Ambassador	August 13, 2009	August 28, 2009	December 16, 2009	September 12, 2019	August 1, 2019
7		Zhang Hanhui (张汉晖)	Ambassador	September 12, 2019	August 10, 2019	February 5, 2020	Incumbent	

== See also ==
- China–Russia relations
- Sino–Soviet relations
- List of ambassadors of Russia to China
