= List of ambassadors of China to Romania =

Coordinates: 44.476085°N 26.091466°E

Chinese Ambassador to Romania
- Incumbent; Jiang Yu since January 2019
- Inaugural holder: Liang Long
- Formation: 15 July 1939; 87 years ago

The Chinese ambassador to Romania is the official representative of the People's Republic of China to Romania.

== List of representatives ==
Diplomatic agrément/Diplomatic accreditation	Ambassador	Chinese language zh:中国驻罗马尼亚大使列表	Observations	Premier of the People's Republic of China	List of heads of state of Romania	Term end
July 15, 1939	Liang Long	zh:梁龙 (外交官)		H. H. Kung	Carol II of Romania	November 18, 1941
September 16, 1941	Lu Yiwen	zh:李芳 (1895年)		Wang Jingwei	Michael I of Romania	
October 5, 1949			The governments in Bucharest and Beijing established diplomatic relations	Zhou Enlai	Constantin Ion Parhon	
February 1955	Ke Bainian	zh:柯柏年	From November 1963 to 1966 he was Ambassador in Copenhague Denmark.	Zhou Enlai	Petru Groza	April 1959
June 1959	Xu Jianguo	zh:许建国 (政治人物)		Zhou Enlai	Ion Gheorghe Maurer	January 1964
June 1964	Liu Fang	zh:刘放		Zhou Enlai	Gheorghe Gheorghiu-Dej	December 1965
March 1966	Zeng Yongquan	zh:曾涌泉		Zhou Enlai	Chivu Stoica	October 1966
June 1969	Zhang Haifeng	zh:张海峰		Zhou Enlai	Nicolae Ceaușescu	May 1973
August 1973	Li Tingquan	zh:李庭荃		Zhou Enlai	Nicolae Ceaușescu	November 1978
January 1979	Chen Shuliang	zh:陈叔亮		Hua Guofeng	Nicolae Ceaușescu	December 1982
April 1983	Li Zewang	zh:李则望		Zhao Ziyang	Nicolae Ceaușescu	December 1984
April 1985	Yu Hongliang	zh:于洪亮		Zhao Ziyang	Nicolae Ceaușescu	July 1987
August 1987	Wang Jinqing	zh:王荩卿		Li Peng	Nicolae Ceaușescu	November 1991
November 1991	Li Fenglin	zh:李凤林		Li Peng	Ion Iliescu	April 1995
July 1995	Lu Qiutian	zh:卢秋田		Li Peng	Ion Iliescu	December 1996
March 1997	Liu Guchang	zh:刘古昌		Li Peng	Emil Constantinescu	August 1999
October 1999	Chen Delai	zh:陈德来		Zhu Rongji	Emil Constantinescu	December 2003
February 2004	Xu Jian (PRC diplomat)	徐坚		Wen Jiabao	Traian Băsescu	October 2007
November 2007	Liu Zengwen	zh:刘增文		Wen Jiabao	Traian Băsescu	November 2011
December 2011	Huo Yuzhen	zh:霍玉珍		Wen Jiabao	Traian Băsescu	January 2015
January 2015	Xu Feihong	zh:徐飞洪		Li Keqiang	Klaus Iohannis	May 2018
March 2019	Jiang Yu			Li Keqiang	Klaus Werner Iohannis	

== See also ==
- China–Romania relations
- List of ambassadors of Romania to China
