= Jiang Yu =

Chinese diplomat

- 姜瑜
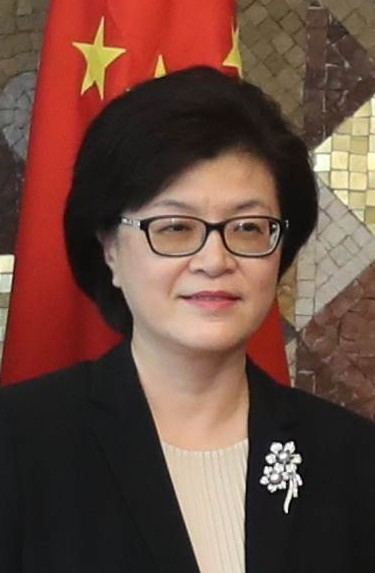
- Jiang in 2024

Chinese Ambassador to Romania
- In office 2019–2022
- Preceded by: Xu Feihong
- Succeeded by: Han Chunlin

Chinese Ambassador to Albania
- In office 2015–2018
- Preceded by: Ye Hao
- Succeeded by: Zhou Ding

Deputy Director-General of the Information Department of the Ministry of Foreign Affairs
- In office 2006–2012

Personal details
- Born: 1964 (age 61–62) Beijing, China
- Party: Chinese Communist Party

Jiang Yu (Chinese: 姜瑜; born 1964) is a Chinese diplomat who served as the special representative for cooperation between China and Central and Eastern European countries within the Ministry of Foreign Affairs of the People's Republic of China from 2022 to 2025. She previously served as the spokesperson within the ministry, and as Chinese ambassador to Albania (2015-2018) and Romania (2019-2022).

== Biography ==
Born in 1964 in Beijing, Jiang graduated with a major in English from China Foreign Affairs University in 1987. From 1987 to 1991, she served in the Beijing Personnel Service Corporation, which was responsible for providing services to foreign institutions in China. In 1991, she joined the Information Department of the Ministry of Foreign Affairs where she worked as a staff member and attaché. From 1992 to 1995, she served as an attaché and third secretary with the Chinese mission in the United Nations.

From 1995 to 2002, she worked as third secretary, deputy director, and director of the Information Department of the Ministry of Foreign Affairs In 2000, the Foreign Correspondents Information Center was established to provide relevant services to journalists in China, and Jiang was appointed as the first director of this organization. From 2002 to 2005, she served as counselor within the Office of the Commissioner of the Ministry of Foreign Affairs in Hong Kong. In 2005, she was appointed as counsellor within the Information Department of the Ministry of Foreign Affairs.

In early 2006, she was promoted to deputy director-general of the Information Department. On 13 June 2006, Jiang attended a regular press conference for the first time as the spokesperson of the Ministry of Foreign Affairs. Over the years, she has become noted for her sharp commentary. In April 2008, following the criticism of China's response to the 2008 Tibetan unrest by CNN commentator Jack Cafferty, Jiang demanded CNN to apologise by stating the "vicious remarks" made "against the Chinese people". In March 2011, during the 2011 Chinese pro-democracy protests, regarding the handling of journalists operating in mainland China in the wake of growing social unease about restricted civil liberties, she said "why do some journalists always run into trouble? I find it strange" and that "journalists should really respect the laws and regulations."

In April 2012, she was assigned as the deputy commissioner of the Office of the Commissioner of the Ministry of Foreign Affairs in Hong Kong. In March 2015, she was appointed as the Ambassador of the People's Republic of China to Albania. During her tenure as ambassador to Albania, she oversaw interactions between Albanian and Chinese business communities. In March 2019, Jiang was appointed as the Ambassador of the People's Republic of China to Romania and on 16 April 2019, she presented her credentials to President of Romania Klaus Iohannis. During her tenure, in May 2020, the Romanian government cancelled state nuclear company Nuclearelectrica's negotiations with China General Nuclear Power Group to construct nuclear reactors 3 and 4 at Cernavodă Nuclear Power Plant and in 2021, Romanian parliament approved a bill which could exclude Chinese telecom company Huawei from having access to Romanian 5G mobile networks. In 2022, she stepped down as ambassador to Romania.

In August 2022, she was appointed as the Special Representative of the Ministry of Foreign Affairs for Cooperation Between China and Central and Eastern European Countries. From June 25 to July 2, 2024, Jiang Yu visited Bulgaria, Slovakia, and Montenegro, where she engaged with officials from the presidential administration, the ministry of Foreign Affairs, parliamentarians, and representatives from business associations and media. She also attended the Forum on Cultural and Creative Industries of China-Central and Eastern European Countries in Bulgaria. She stepped down from the role in 2025 and was succeeded by Chen Guoyu.

Diplomatic posts
Preceded by Ye Hao	Chinese Ambassador to Albania; 2015–2018	Succeeded by Zhou Ding
Preceded by Xu Feihong	Chinese Ambassador to Romania; 2018–2022	Succeeded by Han Chunlin
