= Dong Xiaojun =

Chinese diplomat

Dong Xiaojun (simplified Chinese: 董晓军; traditional Chinese: 董曉軍; pinyin: Dǒng Xiǎojūn; born November 1962) is a Chinese diplomat. He has served as the Chinese ambassador extraordinary and plenipotentiary to Jamaica, Uruguay, and Bulgaria. He graduated from Shanghai International Studies University, China Foreign Affairs University, and Harvard Kennedy School.

== See also ==
- China–Jamaica relations
- China–Uruguay relations
- Bulgaria–China relations

Diplomatic posts
Preceded by Zhang Haizhou	Chinese ambassador to Bulgaria; February 2019－July 2024	Succeeded by Dai Qingli
Preceded by Yan Banghua	Chinese ambassador to Uruguay; December 2015－February 2018	Succeeded by Wang Gang
Preceded by Zheng Qingdian	Chinese ambassador to Jamaica; September 2013－November 2015	Succeeded by Niu Qingbao
