= China's Position on the Political Settlement of the Ukrainian Crisis =

2023 position paper on Russo-Ukrainian war

"China's Position on the Political Settlement of the Ukrainian Crisis" (also "China's Peace Plan") is a document published on February 24, 2023, by the Ministry of Foreign Affairs of the People's Republic of China, which reflects the view of the Chinese authorities on the peaceful end of the Russian invasion of Ukraine. Often referred to as the "plan," the document did not contain specific measures and consisted of the Chinese authorities' earlier statements about adherence to international law, which led some commentators to regard it as a symbolic gesture addressed to Western countries.

== History ==
Wang Yi, head of the Office of the Foreign Affairs Commission of the Central Committee of the Chinese Communist Party, announced the publication of China's proposals for a peaceful end to the Russian invasion of Ukraine on February 18, 2023. The announcement was preceded by numerous high-level contacts between China and Russia, in the absence of discussions involving Ukraine. Commentators expected that the document would be made public during the meeting of the UN General Assembly on February 23, but this did not happen, and China itself abstained from voting on resolution ES-11/6, which demanded the withdrawal of Russian troops in Ukraine.

The document was published on February 24, 2023, on the anniversary of the Russian invasion of Ukraine in 2022. It became the first major international initiative of the PRC after the 20th National Congress of the Chinese Communist Party in October 2022, during which Xi Jinping, contrary to the country's political tradition, was re-elected General Secretary of the CCP Central Committee. In this context, the "peace plan" was tasked with bringing China back into international politics after the COVID-19 pandemic. Contrary to expectations, the document did not contain specific proposals and consisted of vague wording and repeated statements about the "supremacy of the UN Charter", respect for territorial integrity, etc.

== Plan ==
The document includes 12 actions in the plan, which can be summarized in the following points:

1. Respect for sovereignty, guarantees of independence and territorial integrity of all countries, the primacy of international law without double standards.
2. Rejection of the "Cold War mentality", respect for the security interests of individual countries, rejection of the strengthening and expansion of military blocs.
3. Ceasefire.
4. Start of peace talks.
5. Resolving the humanitarian crisis.
6. Protection of civilians and prisoners of war under international humanitarian law.
7. Ensuring the safety of nuclear power plants.
8. Reducing strategic risks, preventing the use of chemical, biological or nuclear weapons.
9. Guarantees for the export of grain within the framework of the Black Sea Grain Initiative.
10. Rejection of unilateral sanctions.
11. Ensuring the stability of production and supply chains to protect the global economy.
12. Assistance to the post-war reconstruction of Ukraine.

The word "war" is not mentioned in the document nor does the document condemn Russian aggression.

== Evaluation ==
Commentators noted that the document was addressed more to Western countries than to Russia or Ukraine. The release of the document coincided with the release of U.S. intelligence reports on ongoing discussions of possible Chinese arms shipments to Russia, which China has denied. Cooperation with Western countries is incomparably more important for China than close ties with Russia. Therefore, Chinese diplomats later had to justify themselves for the statements about the "boundless friendship" between Russia and China made during Xi Jinping's visit to Moscow.

The published document became part of China's positioning as a mediator in resolving international conflicts (earlier, the country also acted as a mediator in the conclusion of a truce between Iran and Saudi Arabia). Moreover, the leaders of European countries directly called on China to use its diplomatic weight to influence the Russian authorities. This policy is aimed at the countries of the "Global South", to which China offers itself as an alternative point of influence, different from Western countries, which does not support military conflicts and advocates a strong conservative position.

Sinologists pointed out that China's proposed approach to a peaceful settlement was primarily in its own interests. China is not interested in the triumph or defeat of Russia: the latter plays a major role in ensuring China's energy security, and thanks to unprecedented sanctions, China is able to buy Russian resources on favorable terms. Russia, on the other hand, is becoming increasingly dependent on China, entering its political and economic orbit. It is in China's interest to end the conflict, which will have a positive impact on the global economy and reduce nuclear tensions following Russia's repeated threats to use nuclear weapons, but the country benefits from continued tensions that divert the attention and resources of China's political opponents.

== Reactions ==
The Ukrainian authorities reacted to China's initiative in a restrained and diplomatic manner, welcoming the very fact of the proposals, but noting the absence of conditions critical for Ukraine in the document, for example, the withdrawal of Russian troops. The United States, the European Union, and NATO have met with skepticism about the "plan," questioning China's ability to act as an unbiased mediator as long as the country does not condemn Russian aggression and continues to blame the EU and NATO for the conflict.

In March 2023, China's proposals were mentioned during Xi Jinping's visit to Moscow, but the entire trip was symbolic and the countries did not sign any important agreements. In the following spring months, the head of China's delegation to resolve the Russia-Ukraine conflict, Li Hui, held a series of meetings in Brussels, Berlin, Paris, Warsaw and other European capitals, as well as Moscow and Kyiv, to promote the peace plan. The Chinese proposals, in which the occupied territories would remain under Russian control, were not commented on by EU member states.

In April 2024, Russian foreign minister Sergei Lavrov stated that the Chinese peace plan had so far been the most reasonable proposal for a peaceful solution of the conflict. Lavrov praised the Chinese peace proposal, which did not include a full Russian withdrawal from all occupied territory; Ukraine and allied nations wanted a full withdrawal. The comment by Lavrov was interpreted by Reuters as implying that Russia would be willing to negotiate a solution that accepts the Russian occupation of territories in Eastern Ukraine, termed by Russian authorities as "new realities on the ground". Switzerland proposed a meeting in relation to the Russian invasion that Lavrov described as unrealistic for Russia because it would not be invited to the meeting.

== May 2024: Brazilian–Chinese six-point plan ==
In May 2024, the Brazilian and Chinese governments proposed a six-point plan:

1. Non-escalation.
2. Non-escalation, direct negotiation, an international peace conference accepted by both Russia and Ukraine, and discussion of all peace plans.
3. Humanitarian assistance, exchange of prisoners of war, no attacks on civilians.
4. No use of weapons of mass destruction
5. No attacks on nuclear power stations; respect for the Convention on Nuclear Safety
6. Stable global trade. "The two sides call for efforts to enhance international cooperation on energy, currency, finance, trade, food security and the security of critical infrastructure, including oil and gas pipelines, undersea optical cables, electricity and energy facilities, and fiber-optic networks, so as to protect the stability of global industrial and supply chains."

== See also ==
- June 2024 Ukraine peace summit – International summit in Switzerland
- Peace negotiations in the Russian invasion of Ukraine
- Ukraine's Peace Formula – 2022 Ukrainian diplomatic initiative
- Victory Plan for Ukraine – Peace plan for Ukraine proposed in October 2024
