= Zhang Deguang =

Chinese politician

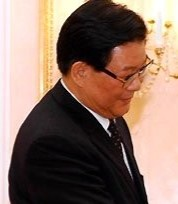
- Zhang in 2003

Executive Secretary of the Shanghai Cooperation Organisation
- In office 15 January 2004 – 31 December 2006
- Preceded by: Office established
- Succeeded by: Bolat Nurgaliyev (as Secretary-General)

Ambassador of China to Russia
- In office July 2001 – October 2003
- Preceded by: Wu Tao
- Succeeded by: Liu Guchang

Ambassador of China to Kazakhstan
- In office April 1992 – August 1993
- Preceded by: Office established
- Succeeded by: Chen Di

Personal details
- Born: 10 February 1941 (age 85) Jining, Shandong, Republic of China, Empire of Japan
- Education: Beijing Institute of Foreign Languages

Zhang Deguang (Simplified Chinese: 张德广; born 10 February 1941) was Executive Secretary of the Shanghai Cooperation Organisation from 2004 to 2006.

== Biography ==
Born in Jining, homeland of Chinese philosophers Confucius and Men Ji, in Shandong Province of occupied China. In 1965 he graduated from the Beijing Institute of Foreign Languages, Faculty of Russian literature. Zhang Deguang speaks Chinese, Russian and English.

In 1965 he joined the Ministry of Foreign Affairs of the People's Republic of China. There he has held the following posts:

- 1965-1973 Employee, translation branch, Ministry of Foreign Affairs of the People's Republic of China
- 1973-1977 Attaché, Embassy of the People's Republic of China in the USSR
- 1977-1987 Second Secretary, First Secretary, deputy director of Chancery, Sino-Russian Negotiations, Department of USSR and European affairs, Ministry of Foreign Affairs, People's Republic of China
- 1987-1992 Counselor, Embassy of the People's Republic of China in the United States
- 1992-1993 Ambassador Extraordinary and Plenipotentiary of the People's Republic of China to the Republic of Kazakhstan
- 1993-1995 Head of the Department of Eastern Europe and Central Asia, Ministry of Foreign Affairs, People's Republic of China
- 1995-2001 Deputy Minister of Foreign Affairs, People's Republic of China
- 2001-2003 Ambassador Extraordinary and Plenipotentiary of the People's Republic of China to Russia

On 29 May 2003, at the meeting of Heads of SCO member states, he was appointed Executive Secretary of the Secretariat of the Shanghai Cooperation Organisation. On 15 January 2004, he took up his duties at this post.

In December 1999 President of the Russian Federation Boris Yeltsin awarded Zhang Deguang with the "Friendship Order". In December 2001 President of Kazakhstan Nursultan Nazarbayev awarded him with First Grade Friendship Order of Kazakhstan. In February 2003 he was awarded as Academician of the Russian Academy of Social Sciences. In April 2003 he was awarded an honorary doctorate by the Institute of Far Eastern Studies and with the First Grade Medal of the Sino-Russian Friendship Society. In October 2003 President of the Russian Federation Vladimir Putin presented him with Commemorative Diploma for special contribution to strengthening Sino-Russian friendship. In March 2004 President of the Russian Federation Vladimir Putin awarded Zhang Deguang with Commemorative Medal on the occasion of the 300th anniversary of Saint Petersburg.
