= Embassy of China, Moscow =

Coordinates: 55.711°N 37.516°E

Embassy of the People's Republic of China in the Russian Federation 中华人民共和国驻俄罗斯联邦大使馆
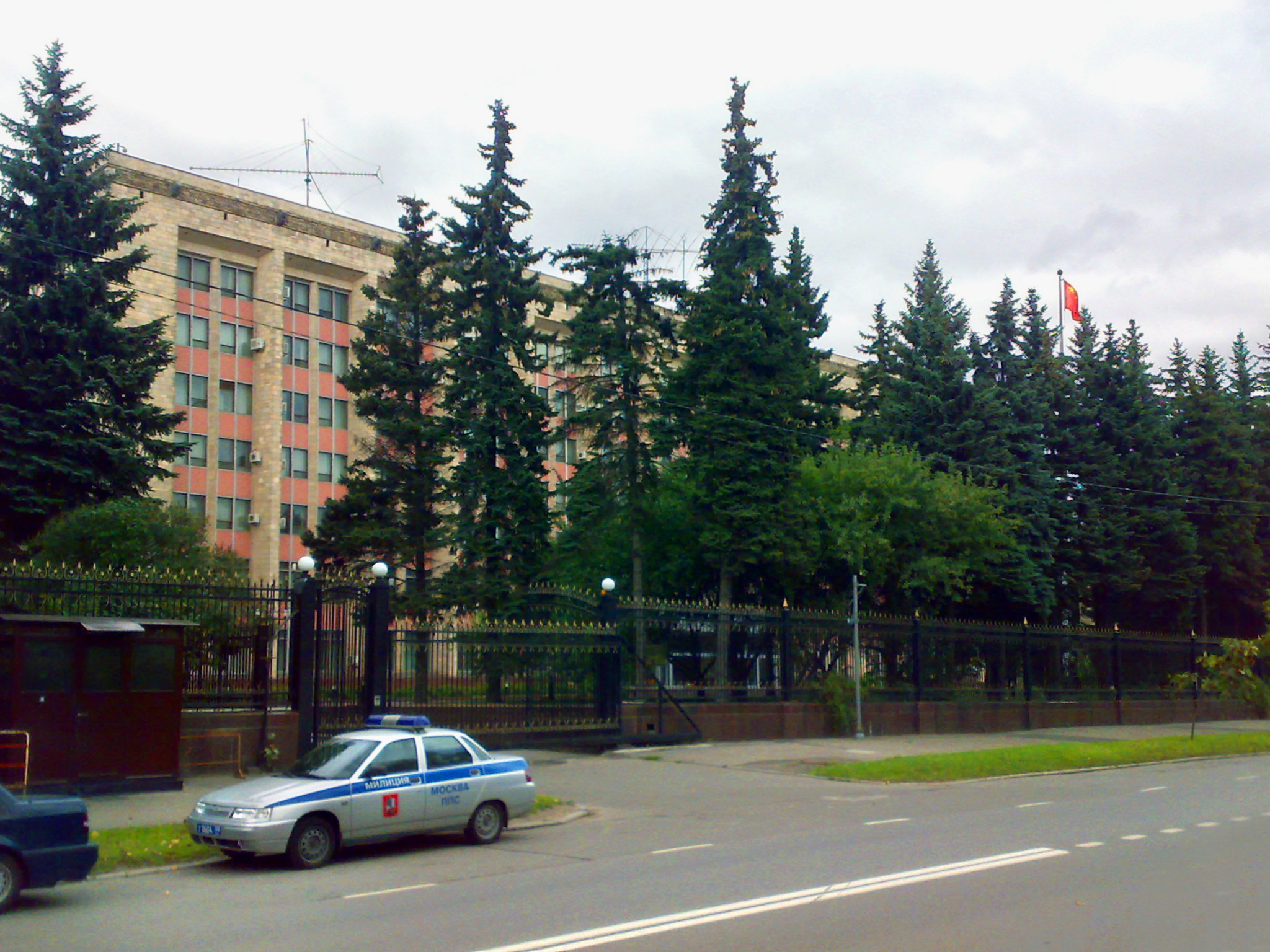
- Location: Ramenki District, Moscow
- Address: 6 Druzhby Street, Ramenki District, Moscow
- Ambassador: Zhang Hanhui
- Website: Official website

The Embassy of the People's Republic of China in the Russian Federation (Chinese: 中华人民共和国驻俄罗斯联邦大使馆; Russian: Посольство Китайской Народной Республики в Российской Федерации) is the diplomatic mission of the People's Republic of China in the Russian Federation. It is located at 6 Druzhby Street (ул. Дружбы, 6) in the Ramenki District of Moscow.

== See also ==
- List of ambassadors of China to Russia
- China–Russia relations
- Diplomatic missions in Russia
- List of diplomatic missions of China
