= Xu Feihong =

Chinese diplomat

- 徐飞洪
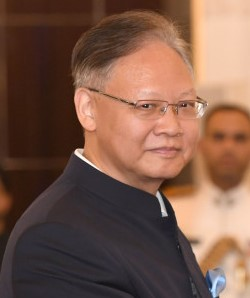
- Xu in 2024

Chinese Ambassador to India
- Incumbent
- Assumed office May 2024
- Preceded by: Sun Weidong

Chinese Ambassador to Romania
- In office January 2015 – May 2018
- Preceded by: Huo Yuzhen
- Succeeded by: Jiang Yu

Chinese Ambassador to Afghanistan
- In office March 2011 – August 2013
- Preceded by: Zheng Qingdian
- Succeeded by: Deng Xijun

Personal details
- Born: May 1964 (age 61–62) Dongyang, Zhejiang, China
- Party: Chinese Communist Party
- Children: 1

Chinese name
- Simplified Chinese: 徐飞洪
- Traditional Chinese: 徐飛洪
Transcriptions
Standard Mandarin
- Hanyu Pinyin: Xú Fēihóng

Xu Feihong (Chinese: 徐飞洪; born May 1964) is a Chinese diplomat, currently serving as Chinese Ambassador to India, in office since May 2024. He served as the Chinese Ambassador to Afghanistan from 2011 to 2013 and Chinese Ambassador to Romania from 2015 to 2019.

== Early life ==
Xu was born in 1964 in Dongyang, Zhejiang, and graduated with a bachelor's degree in law.

== Diplomatic career ==
In 1987, he joined the Ministry of Foreign Affairs of China and till 1991, he served as the staff member and attaché of the Information Department of the ministry. From 1991 to 1993, he served as an attaché with the Embassy of China in Helsinki, Finland. From 1993 to 1995, he served as consular attaché and deputy consul with the rank of third secretary with Consulate General of China in Busan, South Korea.

From 1995 to 1999, he served as the third secretary and second secretary of the Cadre Department within the Ministry of Foreign Affairs. From 1999 to 2002, Xu was assigned to the Consulate General of China in Auckland, New Zealand, where he served as the consul with the rank of second secretary and consul with the rank of first secretary. In 2002, he appointed as the deputy director and director of the Information Department of the Ministry of Foreign Affairs. In 2005, Xu was assigned as counsellor at the Embassy of China in London, United Kingdom, a position he served until 2007.

From 2007 to 2010, he served as the counsellor and deputy director-general of the European Department of the Foreign Ministry. In 2010, he was appointed as the Ambassador Extraordinary and Plenipotentiary to the Islamic Republic of Afghanistan. During his tenure as ambassador, he oversaw of the re-opening of the Chinese state-run Confucius Institute in Kabul in 2013, since its closure in 2010. In 2013, his tenure as ambassador to Afghanistan ended and he was appointed as the deputy director-general of the Cadre Department of the Ministry of Foreign Affairs.

In 2015, Xu was appointed as the Ambassador Extraordinary and Plenipotentiary to Romania and on the same year, he presented his credentials to President of Romania Klaus Iohannis. During his tenure as ambassador to Romania, when asked in an interview about Nobel Peace Prize laureate Liu Xiaobo, Xu called Liu "a criminal who violated Chinese law", and that "Liu Xiaobo's problem is China's internal matter and of the Chinese policy" and that "other countries do not talk and criticize us [China] for this." Xu's tenure as ambassador to Romania ended in 2018 and he was succeeded by Jiang Yu.

In 2018, he was appointed as director of the Service Center of the Ministry of Foreign Affairs and Overseas Missions and in 2021, he was appointed as assistant foreign minister for administrative and financial affairs, serving this position till December 2023. In January 2023, he was elected as the member of the 14th National Committee of the Chinese People's Political Consultative Conference. In 2024, according to reports by Indian media, Xu was being finalized to become the next Ambassador Extraordinary and Plenipotentiary to India, a post that had been vacant for over 15 months since the previous ambassador Sun Weidong stepped down from the post in October 2022. In May 2024, the Ministry of Foreign Affairs of China confirmed to Press Trust of India that President of China Xi Jinping has appointed Xu as the new ambassador to India. On 10 May, Xu arrived in New Delhi to take up his position as the ambassador to India. On 31 May, he along with ambassadors of six other nations presented their credentials to President of India Droupadi Murmu. During his tenure as ambassador, India and China reached an agreement to de-escalate tensions at the Line of Actual Control between the two countries in October 2024 with militaries of both countries completing disengagement of troops at friction points at the line. In August 2025, following President of the United States Donald Trump's imposition of 50% tariffs on India, Xu stated that China opposes it and referred United States as "the bully", and that China would firmly stand with India.

== Personal life ==
He is married and has a son.

Diplomatic posts
Preceded by Zheng Qingdian	Chinese Ambassador to Afghanistan; 2011–2013	Succeeded by Deng Xijun
Preceded by Huo Yuzhen	Chinese Ambassador to Romania; 2015–2019	Succeeded by Jiang Yu
Preceded by Sun Weidong	Chinese Ambassador to India; 2024–present	Incumbent
