= Ma Zhaoxu =

Chinese diplomat (born 1963)

- 马朝旭
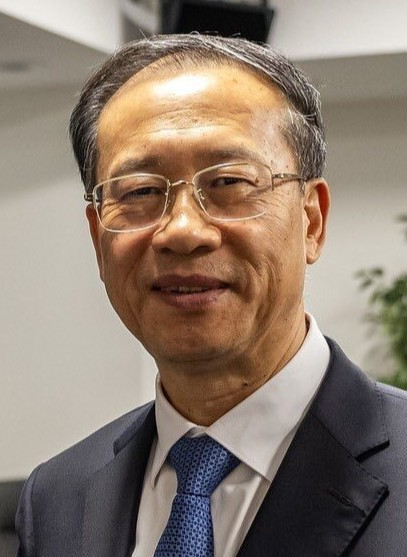
- Ma in 2026

Executive Vice Minister of Foreign Affairs
- Incumbent
- Assumed office 13 January 2023
- Minister: Qin Gang; Wang Yi
- Preceded by: Le Yucheng

Vice Minister of Foreign Affairs
- Incumbent
- Assumed office 15 July 2019 Serving with Deng Li, Xie Feng, Sun Weidong, Hua Chunying
- Minister: Wang Yi (1st term); Qin Gang; Wang Yi (2nd term)

Permanent Representative of China to the United Nations
- In office 25 January 2018 – 10 July 2019
- Preceded by: Liu Jieyi
- Succeeded by: Zhang Jun

Permanent Representative of China to United Nations Office in Geneva
- In office 6 April 2016 – 6 January 2018
- Preceded by: Wu Hailong
- Succeeded by: Yu Jianhua

Chinese Ambassador to Australia
- In office 23 August 2013 – 27 March 2016
- Preceded by: Chen Yuming
- Succeeded by: Cheng Jingye

Personal details
- Born: 1 September 1963 (age 62) Harbin, Heilongjiang, China
- Party: Chinese Communist Party
- Children: 1
- Education: Peking University; London School of Economics

Ma Zhaoxu (also spelled as Ma Chao-hsü; Chinese: 马朝旭; pinyin: Mǎ Zhāoxù; born 1 September 1963) is a Chinese diplomat, currently serving as the Executive Vice Minister of Foreign Affairs with the Minister rank since January 2023.

He previously served as the ambassador of China to Australia, as the spokesman for the Ministry of Foreign Affairs of the People's Republic of China (PRC), and as the director-general of its Information Department. He also served as the Permanent Representative of China to the United Nations (UN) in New York City from January 2018 to July 2019.

== Early life and education ==
Ma Zhaoxu was born in Harbin, Heilongjiang, in September 1963. He graduated from Peking University with a degree in international relations. In 1986, he participated in the inaugural Asian college students debating competition organized by the Singapore Broadcasting Corporation (SBC) and won the "best debater" award.

== Career ==
Ma joined the Foreign Affairs Ministry in 1987 and served in various departments and embassies, including counselor at the PRC embassy in the United Kingdom from 2001 to 2002 and counselor at the PRC embassy in Belgium from 2002 to 2004. He was appointed deputy director of the Policy Planning Department in 2004 and director in 2006. In January 2009, he replaced Liu Jianchao as the director-general of the Information Department as well as the head spokesperson of the ministry.

In April 2010, as spokesman of the Foreign Affairs Ministry, Ma stated that “there are no dissidents in China”, while China responds disapprovingly to the Nobel prize having been awarded to incarcerated Chinese dissident Liu Xiaobo.

On 6 April 2016, he was appointed as the Permanent Representative of the China to the United Nations Office at Geneva (UNOG) and other International Organizations.

In 2018, Ma succeeded Liu Jieyi as China's Permanent Representative to the UN in New York.

Ma was recalled back to China and appointed Vice Minister of Foreign Affairs on July 15, 2019. As vice minister, he is responsible for managing international organizations and conferences, international economy and arms control affairs.

On 13 January 2023, Ma was appointed to the role of Executive Vice Minister of Foreign Affairs taking charge of all daily working affairs. This position is equivalent to a ministerial-level rank.

== Personal life ==
Ma is married with one daughter and two grandchildren. His daughter attended Beijing Jingshan School, graduated from Carnegie Mellon University and George Washington University.

== See also ==
- Chinese in New York City

Government offices
Preceded by Le Yucheng	Executive Vice Minister of Foreign Affairs; 2023–present	Incumbent
