= Zhang Hanhui =

Chinese politician and diplomat

- 张汉晖
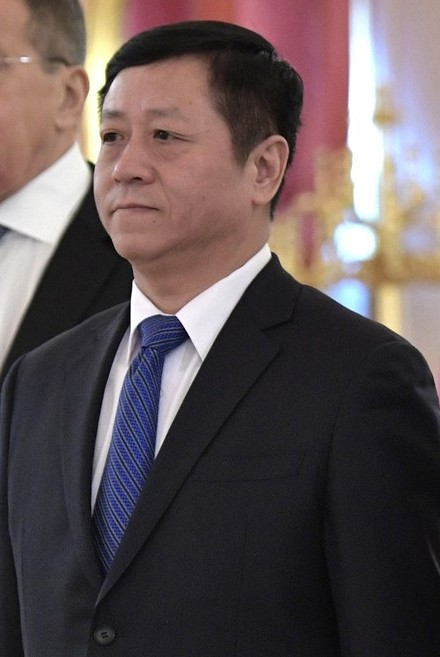
- Zhang in 2020

Chinese Ambassador to Russia
- Incumbent
- Assumed office 10 August 2019
- Preceded by: Li Hui

Chinese Ambassador to Kazakhstan
- In office 2014–2018
- Preceded by: Le Yucheng
- Succeeded by: Zhang Xiao

Personal details
- Born: October 1963 (age 62–63) Jianping County, Liaoning, China
- Party: Chinese Communist Party
- Children: 1
- Education: Shanghai International Studies University

Chinese name
- Traditional Chinese: 張漢暉
- Simplified Chinese: 张汉晖
Transcriptions
Standard Mandarin
- Hanyu Pinyin: Zhāng Hànhuī
- Wade–Giles: Chang Han-hui

Zhang Hanhui (Chinese: 张汉晖; born October 1963) is a Chinese politician and diplomat, currently serving as the Chinese Ambassador to Russia. Previously he served as deputy minister of Foreign Affairs and Chinese Ambassador to Kazakhstan.

== Biography ==
Zhang was born in Jianping County, Liaoning, in October 1963. He graduated from Shanghai International Studies University, where he majored in Russian language and literature.

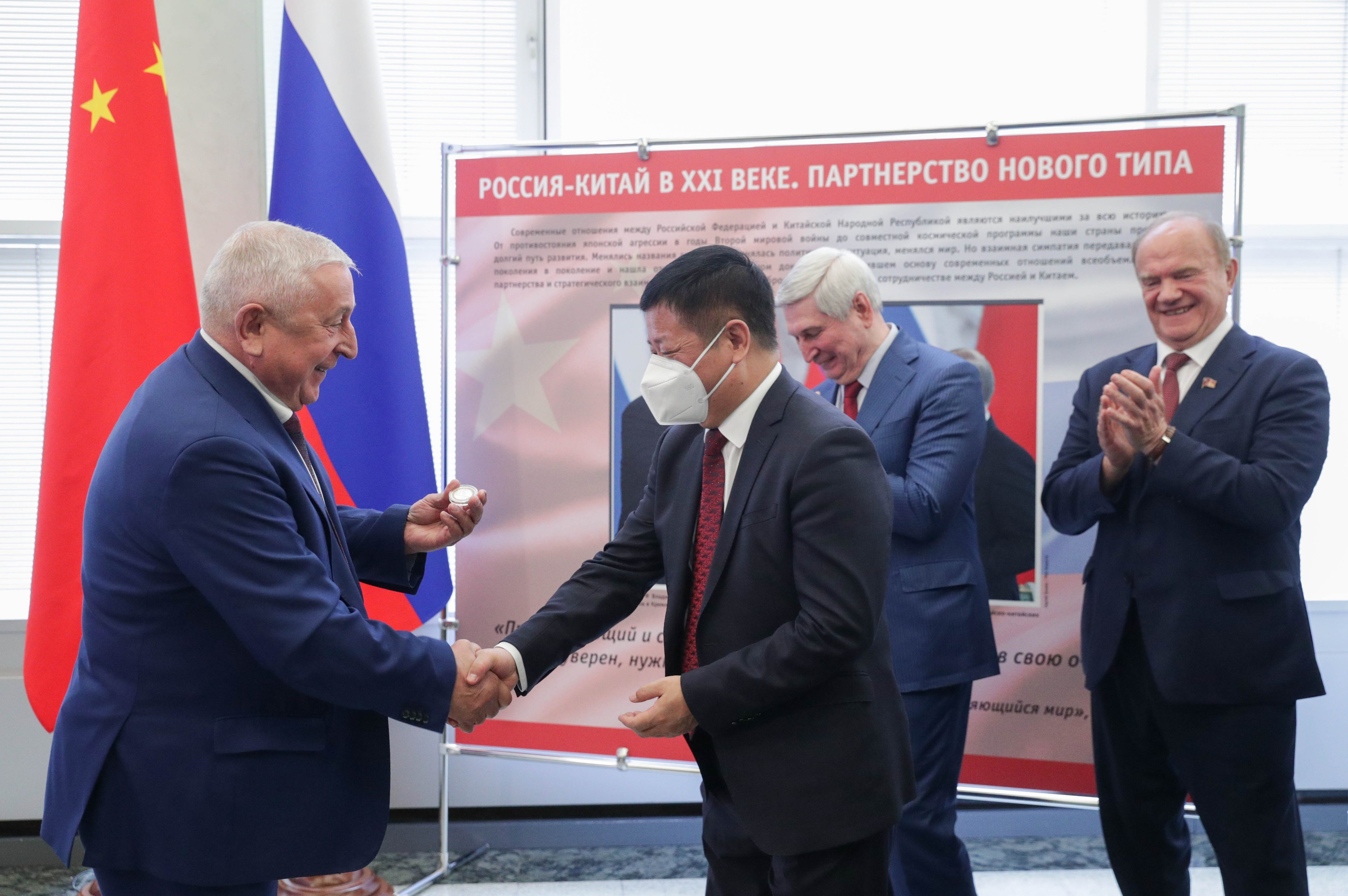
Zhang with Nikolay Kharitonov

After university, he was assigned to the Ministry of Foreign Affairs. In 1991 he was reassigned as an attaché and third secretary to the Chinese embassy in Kyrgyzstan. He returned to China in 1995 and assumed the position of third secretary at the Department of European-Central Asian Affairs under the Ministry of Foreign Affairs. In 2001 he became Counsellor of the Chinese Embassy in Ukraine, a position he held until 2003. He was deputy division chief and division chief of the Department of European-Central Asian Affairs under the Ministry of Foreign Affairs between 2004 and 2014. In 2014 he became Ambassador of China to Kazakhstan, and served until 2018. After a brief stint as assistant foreign minister, he was promoted to deputy minister of Foreign Affairs in charge of relations with European and Central Asian countries. On August 10, 2019, he replaced Li Hui as the Chinese Ambassador to Russia.

== Personal life ==
Zhang is married and has a daughter.

Diplomatic posts
Preceded by Le Yucheng (乐玉成)	Ambassador of China to Kazakhstan; 2014–2018	Succeeded by Zhang Xiao (张霄)
Preceded by Li Hui	Ambassador of China to Russia; 2019	Incumbent
