= Korean grammar =

Grammar of the Korean language

This article is a description of the morphology, syntax, and semantics of Korean. For phonetics and phonology, see Korean phonology. See also Korean honorifics, which play a large role in the grammar.

== Note on romanization ==
This article uses a form of Yale romanization to illustrate the morphology of Korean words. The Yale system is different from the Revised Romanization of Korean seen with place names.

Under the version of Yale used here, morphemes are written according to their underlying form rather than their spelling in the Korean writing system or pronunciation. Under this system, for example, the syllable which is written in Korean as 었 is analyzed as ess even though the ss would be pronounced t before another consonant. To avoid confusion, bold type will represent the morphology (in Yale), and italics will represent Revised Romanization.

== Classification of words ==
- Korean grammar
- Hangul: 9품사
- Hanja: 9品詞
- RR: 9pumsa
- MR: 9p'umsa

The modern standard of word classification and the one taught in public schools was chosen by South Korea's 1963 Committee on Education. This is the 9 pumsa (9품사) system, which divides words into nine categories called pumsa.

The 품사(品詞) pumsa, also called 씨 ssi, are themselves grouped together according to the following outline.

- Content words
  - Substantives
    - 명사 (名詞) myeongsa / 이름씨 ireumssi (nouns)
    - 대명사 (代名詞) daemyeongsa / 대이름씨 dae-ireumssi (pronouns)
    - 수사 (數詞) susa / 셈씨 semssi (number words)
  - Verbs (broadly speaking)
    - 동사 (動詞) dongsa / 움직씨 umjikssi (action verbs)
    - 형용사 (形容詞) hyeongyongsa / 그림씨 geurimssi (descriptive verbs or adjectives)
  - Modifiers
    - 관형사 (冠形詞) gwanhyeongsa / 매김씨 maegimssi (determiners, prenouns, or indeclinable adjectives)
    - 부사 (副詞) busa / 어찌씨 eojjissi (adverbs)
  - Other content words
    - 감탄사 (感歎詞) gamtansa / 느낌씨 neukkimssi (interjections or exclamations)
- Function words
  - 조사 (助詞) josa / 토씨 tossi (particles or postpositions)

Both cardinal and ordinal numbers are grouped into their own part of speech. Descriptive verbs and action verbs are classified separately despite sharing essentially the same conjugation. Verb endings constitute a large and rich class of morphemes, indicating such things in a sentence as tense, mood, aspect, speech level (of which there are 7 in Korean), and honorifics. Prefixes and suffixes are numerous, partly because Korean is an agglutinative language.

There are also various other important classes of words and morphemes that are not generally classified among the pumsa. 5 other major classes of words or morphemes are:

- 어미 (語尾) eomi (verb endings)
- 지시어 (指示語) jisieo / (demonstratives)
- 접속어 (接續語) jeopsogeo (conjunctions)
- 접두어 (接頭語) jeopdueo (prefixes)
- 접미어 (接尾語) jeommieo (suffixes)

=== Substantives ===
==== Postpositions ====
조사 (助詞), josa (also called 토씨 tossi) are Korean postpositions, also known as case markers. Examples include 는 (neun, topic marker) and 를 (reul, object marker). Postpositions come after substantives and are used to indicate the role (subject, object, complement, or topic) of a noun in a sentence or clause. For a larger list, see wikt:Category:Korean particles.

==== Case clitics ====
Case clitics (격조사 (格助詞) gyeok-josa) are clitics that mark the grammatical function of the word. Both nouns and pronouns take case clitics. Pronouns are somewhat irregular. As with many clitics and suffixes in Korean, for many case clitics different forms are used with nouns ending in consonants and nouns ending in vowels. The most extreme example of this is in the nominative (subject), where the historical clitic i 이 is now restricted to appearing after consonants, and a completely unrelated (suppletive) form ga appears after vowels.

- nominative – 이/가 i/ga for the subject, 께서 kkeseo for the subject who is respected
- genitive – 의 ui
- locative – 에 e "to" place or "in" place (e.g. "go to the hospital" or "I am in the hospital")

- locative 2 – 에서 eseo "at" place or "from" place (e.g. "I work at the hospital" or "I came from Korea")
- dative – 에게 ege "to" someone, 한테 hante "to" someone in a casual manner, 께 kke "to" someone who is respected
- ablative – 에게서 egeseo "from" someone, 한테서 hanteseo "from" someone in a casual manner, 께서 kkeseo "from" someone who is respected

- accusative – 을/를 eul/reul for the direct object
- lative – 로/으로 ro/euro "onto" something or "with" something (e.g. "it is moving toward the city" or "I wrote with a pen")

- instrumental – 로써/으로써 rosseo/eurosseo "with" something
- essive – 로서/으로서 roseo/euroseo being "as" something (e.g. "as a teacher, I will help you")
- ablative 2 – 로부터/으로부터 robuteo/eurobuteo something "from" source or origin (e.g. "modern cars are developed from carriages")

- comitative – 와/과 wa/gwa, 랑/이랑 rang/irang, 하고 hago together "with" someone or something
- vocative – 아/야 a/ya, 여/이여 yeo/iyeo "hey" someone being addressed

==== Informational clitics ====
Informational clitics (보조사 (補助詞) bo-josa) provide additional meanings to the words that they attach to. They may override the case clitics, or be placed after other clitics.

Information clitics
| Type | After vowels | After consonants |
|---|---|---|
| Topic* | nun 는 neun | un 은 eun |
| Additive* | to 도 do | |
| Or | na 나 na | ina 이나 ina |

* The topic and additive markers mark the noun phrase with case markers. They override the nominative and accusative case markers rather than being attached after those case markers.

==== Nouns ====
Korean nouns 명사 (名詞) myeongsa (also called 이름씨 ireumssi) do not have grammatical gender, and though they can be made plural by adding the suffix 들 deul to the end of the word, in general the suffix is not used when the plurality of the noun is clear from context. For example, while the English sentence "There are three apples" would use the plural "apples" instead of the singular "apple", the Korean sentence 사과가 세 개 있습니다 Sagwaga se gae itseumnida "(lit.) apple three (things) exist" keeps the word 사과 sagwa "apple" in its unmarked form, as the numeral makes the plural marker redundant. As Korean is a language with no grammatical gender, nouns do not have to agree with verbs. The only agreement needed for Korean nouns would be the object and subject particles (이/가, 을/를, 은/는) added depending on if the noun ends in a vowel or consonant.

The most basic, fundamental Korean vocabulary is native to the Korean language, e.g. 나라 nara "country", 날 nal "day". However, a large body of Korean nouns stem from the Korean pronunciation of Chinese characters e.g. 산 (山) san "mountain", 역 (驛) yeok "station", 문화 (文化) munhwa "culture", etc. Many Sino-Korean words have native Korean equivalents and vice versa, but not all. The choice of whether to use a Sino-Korean noun or a native Korean word is a delicate one, with the Sino-Korean alternative often sounding more profound or refined. It is in much the same way that Latin- or French-derived words in English are used in higher-level vocabulary sets (e.g. the sciences), thus sounding more refined – for example, the native Germanic "ask" versus Romance "inquire".

==== Pronouns ====
Korean pronouns 대명사 (代名詞) daemyeongsa (also called 대이름씨 dae-ireumssi) are highly influenced by the honorifics in the language. Pronouns change forms depending on the social status of the person or persons spoken to, e.g. for the first person singular pronoun "I" there are both the informal 나 na and the honorific/humble 저 jeo. In general, second-person singular pronouns are avoided, especially when using honorific forms. Third-person pronouns are not well developed, and in most cases, a demonstrative 그 geu "that" in combination with a noun such as 사람 saram "person" or 것 geot "thing" is used to fill the gap. Also, only for translation and creative writing, a newly coined term, 그녀 geu-nyeo (literally, "that woman"), is used aphoristically to refer to a female third person. A gender-neutral third person is covered by the demonstrative 그 geu (originally "that"). For a larger list of Korean pronouns, see wikt:Category:Korean pronouns.

==== Numerals ====
Korean numerals 수사 (數詞) susa (also called 셈씨 semssi) include two regularly used sets: a native Korean set and a Sino-Korean set. The Sino-Korean system is nearly entirely based on the Chinese numerals. The distinction between the two numeral systems is very important. Everything that can be counted will use one of the two systems, but seldom both. The grouping of large numbers in Korean follows the Chinese tradition of myriads (10,000) rather than thousands (1,000) as is common in Europe and North America.

=== Verbs (broadly speaking) ===
==== Processual verbs ====
Korean 동사 (動詞) dongsa (also called 움직씨 umjikssi) which include 쓰다 sseuda "to use" and 가다 gada "to go", are usually called, simply, "verbs". However, they can also be called "action verbs" or "dynamic verbs", because they describe an action, process, or movement. This distinguishes them from 형용사 (形容詞) hyeongyongsa.

Korean verb conjugation depends upon the tense, aspect, mood, and the social relation between the speaker, the subject(s), and the listener(s). Different endings are used depending on the speaker's relation with their subject or audience. Politeness is a critical part of the Korean language and Korean culture; the correct verb ending must be chosen to indicate the proper degree of respect or familiarity for the situation.

==== Descriptive verbs ====
형용사 (形容詞) hyeongyongsa (also called 그림씨 geurimssi), sometimes translated as "adjectives" but also known as "descriptive verbs" or "stative verbs", are verbs such as 예쁘다 yeppeuda, "to be pretty" or 붉다 bukda, "to be red". English does not have an identical grammatical category, and the English translation of a Korean hyeongyongsa is usually a linking verb + an English adjective. However, some Korean words which do not match that formula, such as 아쉽다 aswipda, a transitive verb which means "to lack" or "to want for", are still considered hyeongyongsa in Korean because they match the conjugation pattern for adjectives. For a larger list, see wikt:Category:Korean adjectives.

==== Copulative and existential verbs ====
The predicate marker 이다 (i-ta, ida, "to be") serves as the copula, which links the subject with its complement, that is, the role 'to be' plays in English. For example, 대나무는 풀이다 (Taynamwu-nun phwul-i-ta, Daenamuneun purida, "A bamboo is a grass") When the complement, which is suffixed by i-ta, ends in a vowel, i-ta contracts into -ta quite often as in following example, 우리는 친구다 (Wuli-nun chinkwu-ta, Urineun chinguda, "We are friends.") The past tense of 이다 is 이었다 (i-eoss-ta, ieotda, "was"). However, if it is attached after a vowel, it is always contracted into 였다 (yess-ta, yeotda, "was"). If not, it cannot be contracted.

To negate, a special adjective 아니다 (ani-ta, anida, "to not be") is used, being one of the two cases that take complement, the other being 되다 (toy-ta, doeda). Two nouns take the nominative clitic 이/가 (i/ka, i/ga) before the negative copula; one is the subject, and the other is the complement. For instance, in 대나무는 나무가 아니다 (Taynamwu-nun namwu-ka ani-ta, Daenamuneun namuga anida, "A bamboo is not a tree."), 대나무는 (taynamwu-nun, daenamuneun) is the subject and 나무가 (namwu-ka, namuga) is the complement. The derived form 아니요 (aniyo, aniyo) is the word for "no" when answering a positive question.

이다 and 아니다 become 이야 (i-ya, iya), often 야 (ya, ya) after a vowel and 아니야/아냐 (ani-ya/anya, aniya/anya) at the end of the sentence in 해체 (haeche, "informal, non-polite speech level") form. In 해요체 (haeyoche. "informal, polite speech level") form, they become 이에요 (i-ey-yo, ieyo), often 예요 (yey-yo, yeyo) after a vowel and 아니에요/아녜요 (ani-ey-yo/anyey-yo, anieyo/anyeyo) as well as the less common forms 이어요/여요 (i-e-yo/ye-yo, ieoyo/yeoyo) and 아니어요/아녀요 (ani-e-yo/anye-yo, anieoyo/anyeoyo).

The copula is only for "to be" in the sense of "A is B". For existence, Korean uses the existential verbs (or adjectives) 있다 (iss-ta, itda, "there is") and 없다 (eps-ta, eopda, "there isn't"). The honorific existential verb for 있다 is 계시다 (kyeysi-ta, gyesida).

==== Supporting verbs/adjectives ====
Sometimes, just using an adverb is insufficient to express the exact meaning the speaker has in mind. The composition of a main verb (or adjective) and a supporting verb (or adjective) can be used in this case, alongside some grammatical features. Suffixes including -아/어 -a/eo, -게 -ge, -지 -ji, and -고 -go are taken by the main verb (or adjective), and the supporting verb (or adjective) follows it and is conjugated.

===== Examples using -eo/a =====
- -아/어 가다/오다 -a/eo gada/oda: to continue to do, while getting away/closer
- -아/어 버리다 -a/eo beolida: to end up doing (and feel sad, or distressed, to see the result)
- -아/어 보다 -a/eo boda: to try doing
- -아/어지다 -a/eo jida (written without a space): to be done; to become adj.
- -아/어하다 -a/eo hada (written without a space): to feel adj.

===== Examples using -ge =====
- -게 되다 -ge doeda: to be done; to end up doing
- -게 하다 -ge hada: to make someone do

===== Examples using -ji =====
- -지 않다 -ji anta, (-지 아니하다 -ji anihada, -잖다 -janta): not to do; not to be [adjective]
- -지 말다 -ji malda: not to do (in imperative, e.g. 하지 마! "Don't do that!")
- -지 못하다 -ji motada: to be unable to do

===== Examples using -go =====
- -고 보다 -go boda: to do before realizing something
- -고 싶다 -go sipda: to want to do
- -고 있다 -go itda: to be doing

===== Examples using other suffixes =====
- -어야 하다/되다 -aya/eoya hada/doeda: to have to do
- -아도 되다 -ado/eodo doeda: to be permitted to do
- -(으)면 하다 -(eu)myeon hada: to hope to do
- -(으)면 되다 -(eu)myeon doeda: to be okay or desirable to do

=== Modifiers ===
==== Determinatives ====
Korean 관형사 (冠形詞) gwanhyeongsa (also called 매김씨 maegimssi) are known in English as "determiners," "determinatives," "pre-nouns," "adnouns," "attributives," "unconjugated adjectives," and "indeclinable adjectives." Gwanhyeongsa come before and modify or specify nouns, much like attributive adjectives or articles in English. Examples include 각 (各) gak, "each." Determiners also negate the use of pronouns in day-to-day sentences which also makes Korean a more ambiguous and context driven language. For a larger list, see wikt:Category:Korean determiners.

==== Adverbs ====
Korean adverbs 부사 (副詞) busa (also called 어찌씨 eojjissi) include 또 tto "again" and 가득 gadeuk "fully". Busa, like adverbs in English, modify verbs. For a longer list, see wikt:Category:Korean adverbs.

=== Other content words ===
==== Exclamations ====
Korean interjections 감탄사 (感歎詞) gamtansa (also called 느낌씨 neukkimssi) as are also known in English as "exclamations". Examples include 아니 ani "not". For a larger list, see wikt:Category:Korean interjections.

== Sentence structure ==
Korean is typical of languages with verb-final word order, such as Japanese, in that most affixes are suffixes and clitics are enclitics, modifiers precede the words they modify, and most elements of a phrase or clause are optional.

=== Compound sentence ===
A compound sentence is a sentence where two or more independent clauses are equally connected. The verb endings used for connecting the clauses include -고 -go "and", -(으)며 -(eu)myeo "and", -(으)나 -(eu)na "but", and -지만 -jiman "but".

- 이제 겨울이 가고 봄이 돌아 왔지만 이곳은 여전히 춥다. "The winter is now gone and the spring has come back, but the weather here still remained cold."

=== Complex sentence ===
A complex sentence is a sentence where one or more dependent clauses are subordinatedly connected to the independent clause. A lot of endings are used to indicate a wide variety of meanings, making the clause suffixed by one of them subordinate to the other clause. The difference from an adverb clause is not very apparent.

- 길을 걷다가 문득 하늘을 보았더니 달이 참 아름답게 떠 있었다. "I was walking along the street when I suddenly stopped to look up at the sky; the moon was there which was truly beautiful."

==== Noun clauses ====
Followed by noun clause marker -(으)ㅁ -(eu)m or -기 -gi, a sentence can serve as a noun. The markers are attached to the last verb of the sentence. For example, if you want to include a sentence 그가 갑자기 떠났다. (Ku-ka kapcaki ttena-ss-ta., Geuga gapjagi tteonatda., "He left all of a sudden.") into another sentence 무언가를 친구가 나에게 알려 주었다. (Mwuenka-lul chinkwu-ka na-eykey ally-e cwu-e-ss-ta., Mueongareul chinguga na-ege allyeo jueotda., "My friend informed me of something."), then the verb 떠났다 (ttena-ss-ta, tteonatda) combines with -(으)ㅁ (-(u)m, -(eu)m) to make a noun clause 떠났음 (ttena-ss-um, tteonasseum): the resulting sentence is 그가 갑자기 떠났음을 친구가 나에게 알려 주었다. (Ku-ka kapcaki ttena-ss-um-ul chinkwu-ka na-eykey ally-e cwu-e-ss-ta., Geuga gapjagi tteonasseumeul chinguga na-ege allyeo jueotda., "My friend informed me that he left all of a sudden.").

Note that -(으)ㅁ -(eu)m is used in more formal settings, meanwhile -기 -gi is used casually.

- 나는 그가 이미 죽었음을 몰랐다. "I didn't know that he was already dead."
- 그녀가 범인임은 명백하다. "That she is the criminal is clear."
- 일하기(가) 싫다. "I don't feel like working."
- 먹기(에) 좋게 자른 채소 "vegetables chopped for the convenience of eating"

==== Adjective clauses ====
This is the most widely used subordinate clause, even substituting the aforementioned noun clause by taking part in the form -는 것 -neun geot "the thing which". -는 -neun marks the present tense, -(으)ㄹ -(eu)l stands for the future tense, and -(으)ㄴ -(eu)n and -던 -deon are for the past tense, though -(eu)l also acts without meaning any tense as in -ㄹ 때 (-l ttae "when"). See Korean verbs.

- 저번에 우리 서울 올라갔을 때 치킨 먹었던 데 기억나냐? "Do you remember where we had chicken when we were in Seoul?"
- 내가 살던 고향은 꽃 피는 산골 "My homeland where I lived was a mountain town in which flowers bloomed."

Accompanied by several dependent nouns, adjective clauses can comprise idiomatic expressions, such as -ㄹ 것이다 -l kkeos-ida for the future conjugation, -ㄹ 것 같다 -l kkeot gatda, "I suppose...", -ㄹ 수(가) 있다/없다 -l ssu(ga) itda/eopda "It is possible/impossible...", -ㄹ 리가 없다 -l liga eopda "It makes no sense that..."

- 그는 여태 한 번도 늦은 적이 없었다. 오늘 역시 그는 제 시간에 올 것이다. "He has never been late so far. Today, as usual, he'll be on time."

==== Adverb clauses ====
Endings like -이 -i, -게 -ge, -도록 -dorok, and so forth derive adverbial clauses. -이 -i is not commonly used in making clauses except for 없이 eops-i "without"; -게 -ge is in common use in this sense instead.

- 그는 말 없이 나를 쳐다보았다. "He looked at me without a word."
- 물 먹게 그릇 좀 다오. "Please bring a cup for me; I need some water."
- 재미 있게 노는 아이들 "children playing with fun"
- 황금 보기를 돌 보듯 하라. "See gold as if seeing a stone."

A lot of caution is needed when faced with -게 하다 -ge hada and -게 되다 -ge doeda, which may mean just "do -ly" and "become something -ly", but also can make causative and passive verbs, respectively, which consist of main and supportive verbs.

- 정원을 아름답게 하다 (causative) ↔ 발레를 아름답게 하다 (adverbial; causative if intended)
- 방이 깔끔하게 되다 (passive) ↔ 격파가 깔끔하게 되다 (adverbial; passive if intended)

==== Verbal clauses ====
Usually in the form 무엇은 무엇이 어떻다, the whole clause serves as one adjective predicate.

- 토끼는 귀가 크고, 기린은 목이 길다. "A rabbit has big ears and a giraffe has a long neck", or word-for-word, "A rabbit is big-eared, and a giraffe is long-necked."
- 라면은 값도 싸고 맛도 좋지만 건강에는 좋지 않다. "Instant ramen is cheap and tasty but not healthy."
- 나는 배가 좋건만 친구는 사과를 사 왔다. "I like pears, but my friend appeared with apples."

It is also important to note that these examples use the dictionary form of verbs. In natural conversation speakers will use the appropriate honorific forms in order to show respect.

==== Quotation clauses ====
Although the example above 그가 갑자기 떠났음을 친구가 내게 알려 주었다. might be used in a novel, it is unbearably awkward to say in more-general situations. Quotation clauses as in 내 친구가 "걔 갑자기 가 버리데."라고 하더라. (direct quotation) or in 내 친구도 걔가 갑자기 가 버렸다고 하더라. (indirect quotation) are used instead. The particle (이)라고 (i)rago is for direct quotation, and the verb endings like -다고 -dago, -(느)냐고 -(neu)nyago, -라고 -rago, and -자고 -jago are used for indirect quotation, for declarative, interrogative, imperative, and suggesting sentences respectively. Exceptionally, sentences employing a verbal particle 이다 ida and an adjective 아니다 anida are suffixed with -rago in place of -dago for declarative ones.

- 뭐라고요? "What?" or "What did you say?"
- 경찰은 자세한 경위를 조사하고 있다고 밝혔다. "The police announced that they are investigating the details."

The last syllable -go is often dropped. Furthermore, if the verb hada means 'to say' and is right next to the syllable -go, then -고 하다 -go hada is abridged, becoming -다 -da, which of course can conjugate.

- 뭐라디? (뭐라고 하디?)
- 내가 뭐랬어. (내가 뭐라고 했어.) 괜히 기운만 빠졌네. "Do you remember what I said? You only got tired for nothing."

=== Subordinate clauses ===
Verbs can take conjunctive suffixes. These suffixes make subordinate clauses.

One very common suffix, -ko -고 -go, can be interpreted as a gerund if used by itself, or, with a subject of its own, as a subordinating conjunction. That is, mek.ko 먹고 meokgo means approximately "eating," koki lul mek.ko 고기를 먹고 gogireul meokgo means "eating meat," and nay ka koki lul mek.ko 내가 고기를 먹고 nae-ga gogi-reul meog-go means "I eat meat and..." or "My eating meat."

Another suffix, somewhat similar in meaning, is se 서 -seo which is, however, attached to long stem of a verb. The long stem of a verb is the one that is formed by attaching -e/a 어/아 -eo/-a after a consonant.

Both sometimes called gerunds, the verb form that ends in se and the one that ends in -ko juxtapose two actions, the action in the subclause and the action in the main clause. The difference between them is that with se the action in the subclause necessarily came first, while -ko conveys more of an unordered juxtaposition. se is frequently used to imply causation, and is used in many common expressions like manna se pan.kapsupnita 만나서 반갑습니다 Manna-seo bangapseumnida (literally, "Since I met you, I'm happy" -or- "Having met you, I'm happy"). If -ko was used instead, the meaning would be closer to "I meet you and I'm happy," that is, without any implied logical connection.

These are both subordinating conjunctive suffixes and cannot (in the more formal registers, at least) derive complete sentences of their own without the addition of a main verb, by default the verb iss 있. 내가 고기를 먹고 있다 (Nay ka koki lul mek.ko issta, naega gogireul meoggo issda) therefore means "I am eating meat." The difference between this and the simple sentence 내가 고기를 먹는다 (nay ka koki lul meknun ta, naega gogileul meogneunda, "I eat meat") is similar to the difference in Spanish between "Estoy almorzando" and "almuerzo," in that the compound form emphasizes the continuity of the action. The -se 서 form is used with the existential verb iss 있 for the perfect. 문이 열려 있다 (Mwuni yellye issta, mun-i yeollyeo issda, "the door has been opened") can be the example, although it would convey different meaning if the very syllable se were visible, 문이 열려서 있다 'because the door is opened, it exist', meaning of which is not clear, though.

== Questions ==
Questions in Korean are formed using interrogatory verb endings such as -ㅂ/습니까 -(seu)mnikka. The verb ending usage varies according to the speech level.

Interrogative verb endings and speech level.
| | Formal | | Informal | |
|---|---|---|---|---|
| Polite | Hasipsio | -ㅂ/습니까 -(seu)mnikka | Haeyo | -아/어요 -a/eoyo |
| Polite | Hao | -오/소 -(s)o | Haeyo | -아/어요 -a/eoyo |
| Impolite | Hage | -나 -na, -ㄴ/는가 -(neu)nga (procedural verbs), -(으)ㄴ가 -(eu)nga (others) | Hae | -아/어 -a/eo |
| Impolite | Haera | -냐 -nya, -니 -ni | Hae | -아/어 -a/eo |

== Imperatives ==
Imperatives in Korean are formed using imperative verb endings such as -(으)십시오 -(eu)sipsio. The verb ending usage varies according to the speech level.

Imperative verb endings and speech level.
| | Formal | | Informal | |
|---|---|---|---|---|
| Polite | Hasipsio | -(으)십시오 -(eu)sipsio | Haeyo | -(으)세요 -(eu)seyo |
| Polite | Hao | -(으)시오 -(eu)sio | Haeyo | -(으)세요 -(eu)seyo |
| Impolite | Hage | -게 -ge | Hae | -아/어 -a/eo |
| Impolite | Haera | -아/어라 -a/eora, -(으)렴 -(eu)ryeom | Hae | -아/어 -a/eo |

== Suggestions ==
Suggestions in Korean are formed using suggestion verb endings such as -(으)ㅂ시다 -(eu)psida. The verb ending usage varies according to the speech level.

Suggestion verb endings and speech level.
| | Formal | | Informal | |
|---|---|---|---|---|
| Polite | Hasipsio | —N/a | Haeyo | -아/어요 -a/eoyo |
| Polite | Hao | -(으)ㅂ시다 -(eu)psida | Haeyo | -아/어요 -a/eoyo |
| Impolite | Hage | -(으)세 -(eu)se | Hae | -아/어 -a/eo |
| Impolite | Haera | -자 -ja | Hae | -아/어 -a/eo |

== Exclamations ==
Exclamations in Korean are formed using exclamatory verb endings such as -구나 -guna. The verb ending usage varies according to the speech level.

Exclamatory verb endings and speech level.
| | Formal | | Informal | |
|---|---|---|---|---|
| Polite | Hasipsio | —N/a | Haeyo | -네요 -neyo |
| Polite | Hao | -구려 -guryeo | Haeyo | -네요 -neyo |
| Impolite | Hage | -군 -gun | Hae | -네 -ne |
| Impolite | Haera | -구나 -guna | Hae | -네 -ne |

== Negation ==
The negation in Korean can be expressed in the following three forms.

- Negation using 안 an, 아니 ani, -지 않다 -ji anta, and -지 아니하다 -ji anihada
  - This form of negation signifies the absence of volition. It may imply that the agent did not act even though the situation allowed to do so.
- Negation using 못 mot and -지 못하다 -ji motada
  - This form of negation signifies the absence of ability. It may imply that the agent could not act even if the agent intended to do so.
- Negation using -지 말다 -ji malda
  - This form of negation is used for imperatives and suggestions.

In addition, the negation can be achieved through the use of verbs with negative meaning, such as 아니다 anida, 없다 eopda, and 모르다 moreuda.

== Tense and aspect ==
The tense and aspect can be expressed using a variety of non-terminal suffixes and special constructions. The tense is expressed differently when the verb is used at the end of the sentence and when it is used to modify other phrases.

Tense
| | End of sentence | | Modifier | |
| | Procedural verb | Others | Procedural verb | Others |
|---|---|---|---|---|
| Present | -ㄴ/는- -(neu)n- | -∅- (as is) | -는 -neun | -(으)ㄴ -(eu)n |
| Past | -았/었- -(a/eo)ss- | | -(으)ㄴ -(eu)n | —N/a |
| Past | -았/었- -(a/eo)ss- | | -던 -deon (progressive), -았/었던 -(a/eo)tdeon (perfect) | |
| Future | -겠- -gess-, -ㄹ 것이다 -l geosida | | -(으)ㄹ -(eu)l | |

In addition, the progressive aspect can be expressed using -고 있다 -go itda and -ㄴ/는 중이다 -(neu)n jung-ida forms for procedural verbs. The perfect aspect can be expressed using -아/어 있다 -a/eo itda form.

== Number ==
Korean has general number. That is, a noun on its own is neither singular nor plural. It also has an optional plural marker -들 -deul, which is most likely to be used for definite and highly animate nouns (primarily first- and second-person pronouns, to a lesser extent nouns and third-person pronouns referring to humans, etc.) This is similar to several other languages with optional number, such as Japanese.

However, Korean -deul may also be found on the predicate, on the verb, object of the verb, or modifier of the object, in which case it forces a distributive plural reading (as opposed to a collective reading) and indicates that the word is attached to expresses new information.

For instance:

많이들 먹다가들 가거라
mani-deul meokdaga-deul gageora
manidɯl mʌk̚taɡadɯl kaɡʌɾa
{a lot-ADV-PL} {eat-and-PL} {go-IMP}
'You guys eat well and go.'

In this case, the information that the subject is plural is expressed.

To add a distributive meaning on a numeral, 씩 ssik is used.

학생들이 풍선을 하나씩 샀어요
haksaengdeur-i pungseon-eul hana-ssik sass-eoyo
hak̚sɛŋdɯɾi pʰuŋsʰʌnɯl hanas͈ik̚ sʰas͈ʌjo
student-PL-NOM balloon-ACC one-each buy-PRET-INT-POL
"The students bought a balloon each."

Now "balloon" is specified as a distributive plural.

== Subject–verb agreement ==
While it is usually stated that Korean does not have subject–verb agreement, the conjugated verbs do, in fact, show agreement with the logical subject (not necessarily the grammatical subject) in several ways. However, agreement in Korean usually only narrows down the range of subjects. Personal agreement is shown partly on the verb stem before the tense-aspect-mood suffixes, and partly on the sentence-final endings.

Korean distinguishes:

- Honorific subjects from non-honorific subjects in the second or third person via a verb suffix. See Korean honorifics.
- Korean distinguishes first person from non-first in emotion verbs, in that the form "A는 B가 싫다" A dislikes B for example is hardly used for 3rd-person subjects in most registers, and only used inside questions in case of 2nd-person subjects. (A prominent exception is in novels or stories, where it is understood that the narrator is omniscient and can authoritatively describe what's going on inside A's mind.) On the contrary, the form "A가 B를 싫어하다" can be used freely for 1st-, 2nd-, and 3rd-person subjects.
- first person from third person, partially, in the future and the past tense.
- inclusive first person from exclusive first person, and first person from third person, in the jussive mood

Korean does not distinguish:

- singular from plural on the verb (though this is systematically marked on pronouns)
- second person from third person in statements
- second person from first person in questions

The following table is meant to indicate how the verb stem and/or the sentence ending can vary depending on the subject. The column labeled "jussive ending" contains the various jussive sentences endings in the plain style.

| Person | Person agreement on final ending Jussive ending |
|---|---|
| 1st sg (volition) | -getda -겠다 (common) -(eu)rida -(으)리다 -(eu)ryeonda -(으)련다 -(eu)ma -(으)마 |
| 1st pl (suggestion) | -ja -자 |
| 2nd, 3rd (command) | -a/eora -아/어라 |

== Valency ==
=== Valency in Korean ===
- An intransitive verb, an adjective, or a noun plus the predicate particle 이다 -ida requests one argument, the subject, though it may be omitted. (한 자리 서술어)
  비가 내린다. "It is raining."
  하늘이 푸르다. "The sky is blue."
  지금은 아침이다. "It is morning now."
- A transitive verb needs two arguments; one is the subjects, and the other can either be an object, a complement, or an essential adverb. (두 자리 서술어)
  고양이가 쥐를 잡는다. "A cat catches a mouse." (object)
  그는 나에게로 와서 꽃이 되었다. "He came to me and became a flower." (adverb, then complement)
- A ditransitive verb carries three arguments, which always include an essential adverb. (세 자리 서술어)
  나는 엄마한테 김치 세 통을 받았다. "I got 3 boxes of kimchi from my mom."
  동생은 나에게 "다 잘 될 거야."라고 말했다. "My brother told me "Everything's gonna be okay.""

== See also ==
- Korean postpositions
- High-context and low-context cultures
