= Korean verbs =

Part of Korean grammar class

Verbs in the Korean language come in last place in a clause. Verbs are the most complex part of speech, and a properly conjugated verb may stand on its own as a complete sentence. This article uses the Yale romanization in bold to show morphology.

== Classification ==
Korean verbs are typically classified into four categories: action, state (or description), existential, and the copulas.

- Action or processive verbs involve some action or internal movement. For a list of Korean action verbs, see wikt:Category:Korean verbs.
- Stative or descriptive verbs are sometimes called adjectives. For a list of Korean stative verbs, see wikt:Category:Korean adjectives.
- Existential verbs convey the existence of something, or its presence in a particular location or a particular being's possession. This category was created for the verb 있다 itda "to exist" and its opposite, 없다 eopda "not to exist."
- Copulative verbs allow a non-verb to take verbal endings. In Korean this category was created for the affirmative and negative copula. The affirmative copula is 이다 ida "to be," and the negative copula 아니다 anida "not to be." However, there are many other verbs in Korean that also serve to attach verb endings to nouns, most notably 하다 hada "to do."

The distinction between action verbs and descriptive verbs is visible in verb conjugation in a few places. The copulas conjugate like stative verbs, but the existential verbs conjugate like action verbs. Some verbs can be either stative or active, depending on meaning.

== Forms ==
Korean verbs are conjugated. Every verb form in Korean has two parts: a verb stem, simple or expanded, plus a sequence of inflectional suffixes. Verbs can be quite long because of all the suffixes that mark grammatical contrasts.

A Korean verb root is bound, meaning that it never occurs without at least one suffix. These suffixes are numerous but regular and ordered. There are over 40 basic endings, but over 400 when the combinations of these endings are counted. Grammatical categories of verb suffixes include voice (passive or causative), tense (past, present, or future), aspect (of an action – complete, experienced, repeated, or continuing), honorification (appropriate choice of suffix following language protocol), and clause-final conjunctives or sentence enders chosen from various speech styles and types of sentences such as interrogative, declarative, imperative, and suggestive.

=== Sound changes ===
A great many verbs change the pronunciation of the final consonant of the root after the addition of a suffix. Some of these changes are the result of regular consonant assimilation or cluster simplification, but some of them are irregular. The irregular verbs contain root-final consonants that were historically lenited and which, as a result disappeared or mutated between vowels but remained next to a consonant.

=== Citation form ===
The lemma or citation form of a Korean verb is the form that ends in ta 다 da without a tense-aspect marker. For verbs, this form was used as a past perfect declarative form in Middle Korean, but is no longer used in Modern Korean. For adjectives, this form is the non-past declarative form.

=== Infinitive form ===
Besides a verbal root itself that precedes ta in the citation form, there is also a long stem with an additional harmonic vowel, called by linguist Samuel E. Martin the "infinitive" form. This tense-neutral form also does not express any honorifics and speech levels. Thus they are often used for literary titles, subtitles and chapter titles, since they are not specifically directed toward an individual or a group.

This so-called infinitive, however, must not be confused with the citation form mentioned above. It is formed by attaching e/a 어/아 eo/a to the root, according to vowel harmony. If the verbal root ends in a vowel, the two vowels may merge or contract.

Without vowel contraction

- **al** 알 al "know" + **e/a** → **al.a** 알아 ara
- **mek** 먹 meok "eat" + **e/a** → **mek.e** 먹어 meogeo

With vowel contraction

- **ka** 가 ga "go" + **e/a** → **ka** 가 ga
- **o** 오 o "come" + **e/a** → **wa** 와 wa
- **se** 서 seo "stand" + **e/a** → **se** 서 seo
- **i** 이 i (copula) + **e/a** → **ye** 여 yeo
- **ssu** 쓰 sseu "use" + **e/a** → **sse** 써 sseo

toy ta 되다 doeda "to become" may or may not undergo contraction. ha ta 하다 hada "to do" is irregular.

This infinitive form is not used as a noun, but it can be used in compound verbs, serial verb constructions, and before certain (not all) verb endings. It may be compared to the conjunctive in Japanese.

=== Finite verb endings ===
Verbs are the most complex part of speech in Korean. Their structure when used as the predicate of a clause is prefix + root + up to seven suffixes, and can be illustrated with a template:

Finite verb template
		Derivational suffixes			Sentence-final endings			
Prefix	0	I	II	III	IV	V	VI	VII
negative*	ROOT	valency	honorific	tense-aspect	formality	syntactic moods	pragmatic moods	politeness suffix

*The negative prefix is an 안 "not"; the word mos 못 mot "cannot" also occurs in this position.

I Valency may be passive or causative. These often involve a stem change, followed by the suffix i (the spelling of this suffix may change, depending on the stem change of the verb).

II The honorific suffix is -usi 으시 -eusi- after a consonant, -si 시 after a vowel. The i ㅣ is reduced to a glide before another vowel. For example, with a following past tense, sie-ss -si-eoss- reduces to sye-ss 셨 -syeoss-.

This shows deference towards the topic of the conversation, for example when speaking of one's elders.

III If there is no suffix in this slot, the verb is in present or gnomic tense. Future tense & prospective aspect is key-ss 겠 -get-, past perfective is -e/a-ss 었/았 -eot-/-at but with vowel harmony. If there is no intervening consonant, this reduces, both in pronunciation and in writing: a-ss to 았 at-, and wa-ss to 왔 wat-. The verb o 오 "to come" is therefore wa-ss 왔 wat- in the perfective. The verb ha 하 ha "to do" is an irregular hay 했 haet- in the perfective.

There are also compound tenses: remote past -e/a-ss-e-ss 었었/았었 -eosseot-/-asseot-, past-future -e/a-ss-key-ss 었겠/았겠 -eotkket-/-atkket-, remote past-future (An action that should have been completed in the past but has not actually been done) -e/a-sse-ss-key-ss 었었겠/았었겠 -eosseotkket-/-asseotkket-

IV The formal suffix is -p ᄇ after a vowel (it is normally written in the same block as that vowel), -sup 습 -seup after a consonant in a declarative or interrogative verb, -up 읍 -eup after a consonant in a proposition. (After a consonant s or ss the ㅅ letter in the suffix drops.)

This shows deference towards the audience of the conversation, for example when speaking to one's elders. If speaking both to and of one's elders, one would use both the formal and the honorific suffixes.

V The syntactic moods, for lack of a better term, are the indicative -nun 는 -neun, -ni 니, or n ㄴ; the retrospective (imperfective) -ten 던 -deon, ti 디 -di, or t ㄷ -d-; and the subjunctive si 시 -si or s ㅅ. None of these are used in the casual or intimate styles, and the formal plain indicative declarative can only occur in the gnomic tense.

-nun 는 -neun and -ten 던 -deon are used in the formal plain and familiar interrogative styles. After a vowel, -nun 는 -neun reduces to n ㄴ. Before declarative la 라 ra, -ten 던 -deon reduces to te 더 -deo.

-ni 니, -ti 디 -di, and -si 시 are used in the formal polite style.

-n ㄴ, t ㄷ -d-, and s ㅅ are used in the familiar declarative and subjunctive styles.

VI The pragmatic moods, for lack of a better term, are the declarative -ta 다 -da (formal polite), -la 라 -ra (formal plain), and ey 에 -e (familiar); interrogative kka 까, ya 야 (formal) and -ka 가 -ga (familiar); propositive -ta 다 -da (formal polite), -ca 자 -ja (formal plain), and ey 에 -e (familiar); and the imperative o 오 (formal polite), -e/a la 어라/아라 -eola/-ala (formal plain), and -key 게 -ge (familiar).

Style: These distinctions are not made in the intimate and casual styles. Instead, this slot is taken by the intimate suffix -e/a 어 -eo (a 아 after an a ㅏ or o ㅗ) or the casual suffix -ci 지 -ji.

VII The polite suffix yo 요 (-i yo 이요 after a consonant) appears in the informal styles. It expresses one's relationship to the audience.

== Negation ==
A verb is typically negated in Korean by using a suppletive negative form, if it exists, or by putting a negative adverb in front of it.

There are two possible negative adverbs: mos 못 mot, and an 안. mos is used for when a person or animate being subject tries to accomplish an action, that is, begins and is unable to finish it successfully. an is a more common negator which is used in all other instances. The two prefixes are mutually exclusive.

== Derivational suffixes ==
Derivational endings are attached directly to the verb root, and are followed by the tense suffixes. These derivational suffixes end with the high vowels i ㅣ or wu ㅜ which is reduced to a glide in the long stem form. For example, with a following past tense, -(u)si (으)시 -(eu)si reduces to -(u)sye-ss (으)셨 -(eu)syeot.

=== Valency ===
Valency in Korean is partly lexical and partly derivational. Many forms can change their valency by the addition of the passive or causative derivational suffixes, -i 이, -hi 히, -li 리 -ri, -ki 기, -wu 우 -u, -kwu 구 -gu, or -chwu 추 -chu, sometimes with additional changes to the stem.

=== Subject honorific ===
The subject honorific suffix -(u)si derives an honorific verb, that is, a verb which is used when the subject of a sentence is higher in social status than the speaker. Such verbs are used, for example, when speaking of one's elders, one's social superiors (parents, teachers, bosses), or strangers.

The full form -usi 으시 is only used after a consonant. Otherwise, the initial vowel is absorbed, becoming -si.

While the honorific suffix is necessary, some verbs have honorific alternatives which must be used in addition to -(u)si. For instance, ca ta 자다 jada becomes cwu mwu si ta 주무시다 jumusida.

== Tense and aspect ==
Following the derivational endings, Korean verbs can contain up to three suffixes in a row which represent a combination of tense, aspect, and mood.

=== Past ===
This suffix is an enclitic consonant 'ss ㅆ after the infinitive form of the verb (ending in e/a), forming e/a'ss 았/었 (the final consonant is pronounced s͈ before a vowel and t before a consonant). This suffix, which is conventionally called "past" or "perfective" by various linguists, has many different meanings, depending on the semantics of the verb that it is attached to and the context; it may be a simple past or a present perfect.

Etymologically, 'ss is a contraction of the existential verb iss 있 via vowel absorption. The contracted form -e/a iss, was originally a present perfect.

=== Pluperfect ===
A verb can superficially have two copies of the above-mentioned suffix, the second of which, however, is always -ess 었 -eot and represents a true past tense. This results in the combination e/a'ss.ess 았었/었었 -eosseot/-asseot. This combination communicates a past perfect or a more remote past.

=== Future ===
The future suffix is -keyss 겠 -get, often used to describe future events. It is used, when the speaker has valid reasons to believe something will be certain to happen. For instance, the suffix is used in broadcasting contexts in Korean such as weather forecasts.

But it may be used together with the perfective and pluperfect suffixes, or in a present tense context. If used with the perfective suffix, this makes an inferential or conditional past -e/a'ss-keyss 았겠/었겠 -eotget/-atget "should have, would have, must have." If used with the remote past suffix it makes an inferential or conditional remote past -e/a'ss-ess-keyss 았었겠/었었겠 -eosseotget/-asseotget, though this is rare. Because this infix is occasionally used for a conditional, or inferential tense, depending on context it is sometimes called irrealis.

Etymologically, the future suffix is the result of the merger of a resultative verb ending -key 게 and the existential root iss 있, via vowel absorption, as mentioned above. This contraction and change in meaning has its parallel in the future tense of Vulgar Latin.

== Sentence-final endings ==
Sentence-final endings
IV	V	VI	VII
formality	syntactic moods	pragmatic moods	politeness suffix

Not all combinations of the suffixes in the template above are possible. The most common sequences after the tense suffix (that is, after the root or honorific -usi in the present tense, after the -e/ass or -keyss in the past and future) are,

		Formal polite	Formal (book style)	Familiar	Familiar polite
Indicative	declarative	**-(su)pni ta** (스)ㅂ니다 -(seu)mnida	**-(nun) ta** (는)다 -(neun)da	**-n' ey** 네 -ne	**-n' ey yo** 네요 -neyo
Indicative	interrogative	**-(su)pni kka** (스)ㅂ니까 -(seu)mnikka	**-nun ya** 느냐 -neunya	**-nun ka** 는가 -neunga	**-nun ka yo** 는가요 -neungayo
Retrospective	declarative	**-(su)pti ta** (스)ㅂ디다 -(seu)pdida	**-te la** 더라 -deora	**-t' ey** 데 de	**-t' ey yo** 데요 -deyo
Retrospective	interrogative	**-(su)pti kka** (스)ㅂ디까 -(seu)pdikka	**-ten ya** 더냐 -deonya	**-ten ka** 던가 -deonga	**-ten ka yo** 던가요 -deongayo
Subjunctive	propositive	**-(u)psi ta** (으)ㅂ시다 -(eu)psida	**-ca** 자 -ja	**-s' ey** 세 -se	**-s' ey yo** 세요 -seyo
Subjunctive	imperative	**-(u)psi o** (으)ㅂ시오** -(eu)psio	**-e/a la** 어라 -eora/-ara	**-key** 게 -ge	**-key yo** 게요 -geyo

*This indicative -nun 는 is only found in the present tense of action verbs.
**The formal-polite imperative almost always takes the subject honorific suffix -(u)si (으)시.

The intimate, intimate polite, casual, and casual polite endings are simpler.

		Intimate	Intimate polite	Casual	Casual polite
indicative/ subjunctive	declarative/ interrogative/ imperative	**-e/a** 어/아 -eo/-a	**-e/a yo** 어요/아요 -eoyo/-ayo	**-ci** 지 -ji	**-ci yo** 지요 -jiyo

=== Formality ===
The formal suffix is -(su)p ᄇ/습 -(seu)p. The short form is used after a vowel and the long form is used after a consonant. (In the Korean writing system hangul, the ㅂ is written at the bottom of the previous syllable. In South Korea, after ㅅ or ㅆ, the syllable 습 was written as 읍. This rule was modified at the end of the 80s, and 읍니다 is not the standard language. So, nowadays, the syllable 습 is written as 습 as its own pronunciation.) This shows deference towards the audience of the conversation, for example when speaking in a formal situation, such as to (but not necessarily about) one's elders. If speaking both to and of one's elders, one would use the formal and the honorific suffixes together.

=== Syntactic moods ===
The syntactic moods, for want of a better term, are indicative -nun 는 -neun, -n(i) 니/ㄴ; retrospective (imperfective) -ten 던 -deon, -t(i) 디/ㄷ; and jussive -s(i)시/ㅅ.

Style	Indicative	Retrospective	Jussive
Familiar interrogative Formal plain	**-nun** 는 -neun	**-ten** 던 -deon	—
Formal polite Familiar non-interrogative	**-ni** 니* -ni	**-ti** 디* -di	**-si** 시* -si
Casual or intimate	—	—	—

*-ni 니, -ti 디, and -si 시 contract to -n' ㄴ, -t ㄷ, and -s' ㅅ respectively before ey 에.

None of these are used in the casual or intimate styles, and only the formal plain indicative declarative can occur in the gnomic tense.

=== Pragmatic moods ===
The pragmatic moods, for want of a better term, are the declaratives ta 다, la 라, and ey 에; interrogatives kka 까, ya 야, and ka 가; propositive ta 다, -ca 자, and -ey 에; and the imperative o 오, -e/a la 어라/아라, and -key 게.

These distinctions are not made in the intimate and casual styles. Instead, this place is taken by the intimate suffix -e/a 어/아 or the casual suffix -ci 지.

	Declarative	Propositive	Interrogative	Imperative
Polite	**ta** 다 -da		**kka** 까 -kka	**o** 오 -o
Plain	**la** 라 -ra	**ca** 자 -ja	**ya** 야 -ya	**e/ala** 아라/어라 -eora/-ara
Familiar	**ey** 에 -e		**ka** 가 -ga	**key** 게 -ge
Intimate	**e/a** 어/아 -eo/-a			
Casual	**ci** 지 -ji			

=== Politeness suffix ===
The polite suffix yo 요 appears in the lower speech levels. It raises the level of politeness of those styles.

== Attributive endings ==
Attributive verb endings modify nouns and take the place of attributive adjectives. Korean does not have relative pronouns. Instead, attributive verbs modify nouns, as adjectives do in English. Where in English one would say "I saw the man who walks the dog", the structure of Korean is more like "The dog-walking man I saw".

The structure is ROOT + valence + attributive suffix, with little of the complexity of finite verbs above.

Attributive verb template
Prefix	0	I	II	III
negative	ROOT	valency	tense	attributive (tense)

Active verbs use the attributive suffix 은 -eun after a consonant, or -n ㄴ after a vowel, for the past tense. For descriptive or stative verbs, often equivalent to adjectives in English, this form is used for generic (gnomic) descriptions; effectively, "eaten food" is food which once was eaten (past), whereas "a pretty flower" is a flower which has become pretty, and still is (present/timeless). To specify the ongoing action for an active verb, the invariable suffix 는 -neun is used instead. This is not found on descriptive verbs, as it makes no sense to say that *"a flower is being pretty". For the future, the suffix 을/ㄹ (-(eu)l with reinforcement of the following consonant) is used, and in the imperfective/retrospective (recalling what once was) it is 던 -deon.

For example, from the verb 먹 meok "to eat", the adjective 예쁘 yeppeu "pretty", and the nouns 밥 bap "cooked rice" and 꽃 kkot "flower", we get:

Attributive forms
	Active						Descriptive		
Present progressive	먹는 밥	meogneun bap	"cooked rice being eaten"						
Perfective	먹은 밥	meogeun bap	"eaten cooked rice (cooked rice which was eaten)"				예쁜 꽃	yeppeun kkot	"a pretty flower"
Imperfective	먹던 밥	meokdeon bap	"once-eaten cooked rice (cooked rice which used to be eaten)"	먹었던 밥	meogeotdeon bap	"cooked rice which had been eaten"	예쁘던 꽃	yeppeudeon kkot	"a once-pretty flower"
Future	먹을 밥	meogeul ppap	"cooked rice to be eaten"	먹었을 밥	meogeosseul ppap	"cooked rice which would be eaten"	예쁠 꽃	yeppeul kkot	"a flower which will be pretty"

The perfective suffix 었 -eoss- is sometimes used as well, with the same meaning, on active verbs. It precedes the attributive suffix.

For action verbs, -ess 었 is used for completed actions or processes that result in a present state. The individual verb's meaning can help determine which interpretation is appropriate. Hence 결혼했다 gyeorhon haetda can mean ‘got married’, focusing on the past event, or ‘is married’, focusing on the present state resulting from the past event. But 공을 찼다 gong-eul chatda ‘kicked the ball’ can only denote a past action and 잘 생겼다 jal saenggyeotda ‘is handsome’ can only denote the present state. (생기다 saenggida is an action verb, meaning ‘get formed/created’.)

== Conjunctive endings ==
Verbs can take conjunctive suffixes. These suffixes make subordinate clauses.

One very common suffix 고 -go, can be interpreted as a subordinating conjunction. That is, 먹고 meokko means approximately "eating," 고기를 먹고 gogireul meokko means "eating meat," and 내가 고기를 먹고 naega gogireul meokko means "I eat meat and..." or "My eating meat."

Another suffix, somewhat similar in meaning, is 서 -seo which is, however, attached to the long stem of a verb ending in -e/a.

Both juxtapose two actions, the action in the subclause and the action in the main clause. The difference between them is that with seo the action in the subclause necessarily came first, while -go conveys more of an unordered juxtaposition. Seo is frequently used to imply causation, and in many common expressions like 만나서 반갑습니다 mannaseo bangapseumnida (literally, "Since I met you, I'm happy" or "Having met you, I'm happy"). If -go was used instead, the meaning would be closer to "I meet you and I'm happy," that is, without any implied logical connection.

These are both subordinating conjunctive suffixes and can not (in the more formal registers, at least) derive complete sentences of their own without the addition of a main verb, by default the existential verb 있다 itda.

== Syntax ==
As a typical right-headed subject–object–verb language, verbs are typically the last element in a Korean sentence, and the only one necessary. That is, a properly conjugated verb can form a sentence by itself. The subject and the object of a sentence are often omitted when these are considered obvious in context. For example, the sentence: chac.ass.ta 찾았다! chajatda! ("[I] found [it]!") consists of only a verb because the context in which this sentence would occur makes the identity of the arguments obvious.
