= Honorifics (linguistics) =

Social status and privilege as a grammatical function in many languages

In linguistics, an honorific (abbreviated hon) is a grammatical or morphosyntactic form that encodes the relative social status of the participants of the conversation. Distinct from honorific titles, linguistic honorifics convey formality form, social distance, politeness pol, humility hbl, deference, or respect through the choice of an alternate form such as an affix, clitic, grammatical case, change in person or number, or an entirely different lexical item. A key feature of an honorific system is that one can convey the same message in both honorific and familiar forms—i.e., it is possible to say something like (as in an oft-cited example from Brown and Levinson) "The soup is hot" in a way that confers honor or deference on one of the participants of the conversation.

Honorific speech is a type of social deixis, as an understanding of the context—in this case, the social status of the speaker relative to the other participants or bystanders—is crucial to its use.

There are three main types of honorifics, categorized according to the individual whose status is being expressed:

- Addressee (or speaker/hearer)
- Referent (or speaker/referent)
- Bystander (or speaker/bystander)

Addressee honorifics express the social status of the person being spoken to (the hearer), regardless of what is being talked about. For example, Javanese has three different words for "house" depending on the status level of the person spoken to. Referent honorifics express the status of the person being spoken about. In this type of honorific, both the referent (the person being spoken about) and the target (the person whose status is being expressed) of the honorific expression are the same. This is exemplified by the T–V distinction present in many Indo-European languages, in which a different second-person pronoun (such as tu or vous in French) is chosen based on the relative social status of the speaker and the hearer (the hearer, in this case, also being the referent). Bystander honorifics express the status of someone who is nearby, but not a participant in the conversation (the overhearer). These are the least common, and are found primarily in avoidance speech such as the "mother-in-law languages" of aboriginal Australia, where one changes one's speech in the presence of an in-law or other tabooed relative.

A fourth type, the Speaker/Situation honorific, does not concern the status of any participant or bystander, but the circumstances and environment in which the conversation is occurring. The classic example of this is diglossia, in which an elevated or "high form" of a language is used in situations where more formality is called for, and a vernacular or "low form" of a language is used in more casual situations.

Politeness can be indicated by means other than grammar or marked vocabulary, such as conventions of word choice or by choosing what to say and what not to say. Politeness is one aspect of register, which is a more general concept of choosing a particular variety of language for a particular purpose or audience.

== T–V distinction in Indo-European languages ==
One common system of honorific speech is T–V distinction. The terms T-form and V-form to describe the second person pronouns tu and vos, respectively, were introduced by Brown and Gilman, whose 1960 study of them introduced the idea that the use of these forms was governed by "power and solidarity." The Latin tu refers to the singular T-form, while the Latin vos refers to the V-form, which is usually plural-marked. Tu is used to express informality, and in contrast, vos is used to express politeness and formality. T–V distinction is characteristic of many Indo-European languages, including Hindustani (Hindi-Urdu), Odia, Persian, Portuguese, Polish, and Russian, as detailed below.

=== Brazilian Portuguese ===
The pronouns tu (informal) and você (more formal) fit the T–V pattern nicely, except that their use varies a great deal from region to region. For instance, in most parts of Brazil, tu is not used; whereas in the northern state of Maranhão and southern regions, it is. A third lexical option is added to the honorific scheme: o senhor and a senhora (literally meaning "sir" and "madam"), which are third-person references that are used in direct address that would normally require the second person tu or você). These forms are highly formal and used when speaking "upward" and always used in formal correspondence, such as in governmental letters, to authorities, customers and elders.

=== Indo-Aryan languages ===
Many Indo-Aryan languages, including Hindustani (Hindi-Urdu), Odia, and Bengali, have three instead of two levels of honorifics. The use of tū, tum and āp in Hindustani (Hindi-Urdu), or their cognates in other languages (e.g. Odia tu, tumē/tumbhē and āpåṇå, Bengali tui, tumi and āpni; respectively), indicates increasing levels of formality or social status of the addressee. The verb changes accordingly to agree with the pronoun.

In other Indo-Aryan languages, such as Punjabi, Gujarati and Marathi, while there ostensibly exists a three-way distinction in formality, in practice, the cognate of āp is almost never used (though in Punjabi, āp jī is used in somewhat rare cases), and there is only a two-way distinction between the tū- and tum-equivalents (in fact, the tum-equivalent in Punjabi, i.e., tusī̃/tusā̃, is both used as āp and tum are used in Hindustani).

=== Persian ===
As an Indo-European language the pronouns tu (informal) and šumā (more formal form of second-person single and also used alone for second-person plural) fit the T–V pattern except that šumā is actually a modern Persian word originating from the Early New Persian (ENP) words šēwā where wā used as more formal form of second-person single and also used alone for second-person plural and šē which means for him or his. Therefore, the words šēwā together, had been used to refer to formal form of second-male person single and also used alone for second-male person plural.

=== Polish ===
Polish incorporates grammatical and lexical politeness. It uses grammatical category of honorifics within certain verbs and personal pronouns; this honorific system is namely split into two basic levels – the familiar (T) and the polite (V):

- ty: second-person singular, informal
- on (masculine) / ona (feminine): third-person singular, informal (there is also a neuter ono, but it is not used when referring to people, except when the noun reference happens to be neuter, as in the case of dziecko, child)
- wy: second-person plural, informal
- oni (used when referring to a group of men or a mixed-sex group)/one (when referring to a group of women): third-person plural
- pan (male-marked) / pani (female-marked): second- and third-person singular, formal
- panowie (male-marked) / panie (female-marked) / państwo (mixed gender): second- and third-person plural, formal

Sometimes panna is used for an unmarried woman, along with using different suffixes for last name, although it is mostly obsolete and can be considered condescending. Using first name alone is familiar (but not necessarily intimate, as in Japanese—it is commonly used among colleagues, for example). Using the last name alone is extremely rare and when it is employed, it is condescending, and used among school pupils and in the military. Also using Pan/Pani with surname in vocative form is rather impolite. The address in form "proszę Pana/Pani" is preferred. Pan/Pani can be used as a prefix to a first or last name, as in the example:

- Pan Karol: Mr. Karol
- Pani Kowalska: Mrs./Ms. Kowalska
- Pani Anna: Mrs./Ms. Anna

Which are more formal than using the typical familiar ty/on/ona, but they may imply familiarity, especially in second person. Using a prefix with the first name is almost always considered familiar and possibly rude. Using the last name with a prefix in second person can still be considered impolite. Using the set phrase proszę pana, proszę pani is preferred (and polite) when drawing attention (in a way akin to using sir in English).

In addition, there are two different V forms within the honorific usage – the more formal and the less formal form. The less formal form is more colloquial and used in daily speech more frequently. The higher honorific level includes "compound" pronouns consisting of prefixal pan or pani in conjunction with professional titles. Here are some examples (for males/females resp.):

- Pan minister / Pani minister: Minister
- Pan dyrektor / Pani dyrektor: Director
- Pan kierowca / Pani kierowca: driver
- Pan doktor / Pani doktor: doctor

These professional titles are more formal as the speaker humbles him/herself and puts the addressee at a higher rank or status. These can also be used along with a name (only last or both names), but that is extremely formal and almost never used in direct conversation. For some professional titles (e.g. doktor, profesor), the pan/pani can be dropped, resulting in a form which is less formal, but still polite. Unlike the above, this can also precede a name (almost always last), but it is seldom used in second person. As with pan/pani phrases such as proszę pana ministra (which can be translated "Minister, sir") can also be used for calling attention, although they are less common. The pan/pani can also be dropped with some titles in the phrase, but it is even less common and can be inappropriate.

Historical factors played a major role in shaping the Polish usage of honorifics. Poland's history of nobility was the major source for Polish politeness, which explains how the honorific male-marked pronoun pan (pani is female-marked) was derived from the old word for "lord." There are separate honorific pronouns used to address a priest (ksiądz), a nun or nurse (siostra). It is acceptable to replace siostra with pani when addressing a nurse, but it is unacceptable when speaking to a nun. Likewise, it is unacceptable to replace ksiądz with pan when speaking to a priest. It is however accepted and commonly used to replace ksiądz with ojciec (Father) . As with pan/pani phrases such as proszę ojca (which can be translated "Father, sir") can also be used for calling attention. The intimate T form is marked as neutral when used reciprocally between children, relatives, students, soldiers and young people.

=== Russian ===
Native Russian speakers usually know when to use the informal second person singular pronoun (ty) or the formal form (vy). The practice of being informal is known as týkan’e while the practice of being formal and polite is referred to výkan’e.

It has been suggested that the origin of vy-address came from the Roman Empire and the French due to the influence of their language and culture on the Russian aristocracy. In many other European countries, ty initially was used to address any one person or object, regardless of age and social ranking. Vy was then used to address multiple people or objects altogether. Later, after being in contact with foreigners, the second person plural pronoun acquired another function. Displaying respect and formality, it was used for addressing aristocrats – people of higher social status and power.

Another theory suggests that in Russia, the Emperor first adopted the plural vy-form. The Emperor is considered plural because he is the representation of the people. Likewise, the Emperor could refer to himself using vos (we), to represent "I and my people". From the courts, the middle and lower classes gradually adopted this usage.

The younger generation and commoners, with minimal education still address each other using ty with no connotation of disrespect, however. Certain Russians who are used to vy-address may perceive the ones who do not differentiate between ty and vy forms as uneducated, offensive and uncultured. This leads to the conclusion that this honorific was not a Russian innovation. Instead, the use of vy in both the singular and plural form is due to the exposure to the Latin historical and political developments. The usage of vy did not spread throughout the Russian population quickly; as a result, the usage was inconsistent until the eighteenth century, when Vy became more prominent in secular literature.

=== French ===
In French the singular form 'tu' is used in intimate and informal speech, as well as "speaking down", as adults to children (but never "up"). The plural form 'vous' is used to address individuals formally and in situations in which adults meet for the first time. Often people decide explicitly to break the formal by one or the other asking "on se tutoie?" (where "tutoyer" is the verb meaning to speak in the 'tu' register, its equivalent being "vouvoyer").

Also, the normally first person plural form "nous" may be used as a "humility mark" especially in formal communications like college thesis, to recognise that the work done is not the result of the single author of the thesis but comes from in a way, of all the predecessors and pairs in the realm of knowledge of the subject.

=== German ===
German has 'Sie' or 'Ihr' (archaic) as formal pronouns, and 'ihr' (pl.) and 'du' (sg.) as informal pronouns.

=== English ===
Modern English has no grammatical system of honorific speech, with formality and informality being conveyed entirely by register, word choice, tone, rhetorical strategy, etc.

Middle English once exhibited a T–V distinction between the 2nd person singular pronoun thou and the 2nd person plural ye and later you, with the latter being used as an honorific regardless of the number of addressees. Thou and its associated forms have fallen into disuse and are considered archaic, though it is often used in recreations of archaic-sounding speech. It has also survived in some dialect forms of English, notably in some regions of Yorkshire, especially amongst the older and more rural populations. Ye usage can still be found in pockets of the east coast of North America, such as rural Newfoundland.

=== Spanish ===
In most dialects of Spanish, the term 'tu' is used for addressing a singular person with the same or lower social standing (colleagues, coworkers, younger people), while 'usted' is used in formal settings and with people with higher social hierarchy (with bosses, the elderly, etc.), though there is some variation depending on the region. The plural terms for 'tu' and 'usted' are 'vosotros' and 'ustedes', respectively. In some countries, most notably Argentina and Uruguay, 'vos' is used for the closest or most intimate people, with 'tu' being in a middle zone between 'vos' and 'usted'.

== Avoidance speech ==
Avoidance speech, or "mother-in-law language", is the most common example of a bystander honorific. In this honorific system, a speaker switches to a different variety of speech in the presence of an in-law or other relative for whom an affinal taboo exists. These languages usually have the same phonology and grammatical structure as the standard language they derived from, but are characterized by a smaller lexical inventory than the standard language. Avoidance speech of this sort is primarily found in Australian Aboriginal languages such as Dyirbal, but can also be found in some Native American languages, including Navajo, and some Bantu languages, including Zulu.

=== Dyirbal ===
The Dyirbal language has a special avoidance speech style called Jalnguy that is used by a speaker when in the presence of the speaker's mother-in-law. This mother-in-law language has the same phonology and grammar as the everyday style, but uses an almost totally distinct set of lexemes when in the presence of the tabooed relative. This special lexicon has fewer lexemes than the everyday style and typically employs only transitive verb roots whereas everyday style uses non-cognate transitive and intransitive roots. By using this mother-in-law language a speaker then indicates a deferential social relationship.

=== Guugu-Yimidhirr ===
In Guugu-Yimidhirr, a traditional Australian Aboriginal language, special avoidance lexemes are used to express deference when in the presence of tabooed in-law relatives. In other words, speakers will either be completely prohibited from speaking to one's mother-in-law or must employ "avoidance language" to one's brother-in-law. The brother-in-law language involves a special set of words to replace regular Guugu-Yimidhirr words and the speaker must avoid words which could suggest reference to genitalia or bodily acts. This brother-in-law language therefore indexes a deferential social relationship of the brother-in-law to the speaker and is reflected in the appropriate social behavior of Guugu-Yimidhirr society. For example, one avoids touching tabooed in-laws, looking at them, joking with them, and cursing in their presence.

=== Mortlockese ===
The Mortlockese language uses avoidance speech between genders. In Mortlock culture, there are many restrictions and rules when interacting with people of the opposite gender, such as how only men and boys are allowed to go fishing or how women are supposed to lower their posture in the presence of men. This avoidance speech showcases one of these restrictions/rules. This gender-restrictive vocabulary can only be used when speaking to people of the same gender. For men, this is sometimes referred to as kapsen leefalang or the speech of the cookhouse.

== Other examples of honorifics ==
=== Chinese ===
In modern Chinese, the informal second-person pronoun, 你 (nǐ), is most commonly used. Meanwhile, 您 (nín) which arose from the contraction of plural second-person pronoun 你们 (nǐ mén) is used in formal situations.

Before the New Culture Movement which occurred right after the end of the Qing dynasty, the language had an elaborate system of honorifics, and different expressions were used depending on the societal position of the speaker and listener, politeness, and deference. Using self-deprecation to show humbleness was prevalent, for instance one would refer to works of their own as 拙作 (zhuó zuò) "unsightly work" while referring to other people's work as 尊作 (zūn zuò) "respectable work". It has mostly degenerated since then, but vestiges of the system still exist:

- When referring to one's relatives in formal situations, 敬称 (jìng chēng) is used. For example, when referring to one's brother, one would use 家弟/舍弟 (jiā dì/shě dì) "(my) house younger brother", whereas when referring to the listener's brother, one would use 令弟 (lìng dì) "(your) excellent younger brother". This is in contrast to the common term 弟弟 (dìdì) "younger brother".
- Using indirect language and euphemisms (婉辭; wǎn cí) to show respect is still widely observed in all situations.

=== Japanese ===
Japanese honorific speech requires either honorific morphemes to be appended to verbs and some nouns or verbs and pronouns be replaced by words that mean the same but incorporate different honorific connotations. Japanese honorific speech is broadly referred to as keigo (literally "respectful language"), and includes three main categories according to Western linguistic theory: sonkeigo, respectful language; kensongo or kenjōgo, humble language; and teineigo, polite language.

1. Sonkeigo
  - raises the status of the addressee or referent (e.g. third person) in relation to the speaker
  - encodes a feeling of respect
  - example: 先生がそちらにお出でになる。 Sensei ga sochira ni oide ni naru. 'The teacher is going there.'
2. Kenjōgo
  - humbles the status of the speaker in relation to the addressee or referent
  - encodes a feeling of humility
  - example: 明日先生のところに伺う。 Asu sensei no tokoro ni ukagau. 'I will go to the teacher's place tomorrow.'
3. Teineigo
  - raises the status of the addressee or referent in relation to the speaker
  - encodes politeness
  - example: 先生がそちらに行きます。 Sensei ga sochira ni ikimasu. 'The teacher is going there.'

Another subcategory of keigo is bikago or bika-hyōgen, which means "word beautification" and is used to demonstrate the quality of the speaker's language. Each type of speech has its own vocabulary and verb endings.

Japanese linguist Hatsutarō Ōishi distinguishes four sources of respect as the primary reasons for using keigo:

1. respecting those who have a higher social rank, extraordinary ability, or credentials
2. respecting those who occupy a dominant position
3. respecting those to whom one is indebted
4. respect for humanity

Comparatively, a more contemporary linguistic account by functional linguist Yasuto Kikuchi posits that honorific speech is governed by social factors and psychological factors.

Some examples of what Kikuchi considers social factors include:
- the location and topic being discussed by the speaker
- whether the context is written or spoken
- interpersonal relationships between the speaker, listener, and referent (i.e. positional relationships, relative familiarity, and in-group/out-group relationships).

Some examples of what Kikuchi considers psychological factors are:
- the intention of the speaker in using polite speech
- how relative distance in relationships is understood
- how skilled the speaker is in expression.

=== Javanese ===
Speech levels, although not as developed or as complex as honorific speech found in Japanese, are but one of a complex and nuanced aspect of Javanese etiquette: etiquette governs not only speaking but, "sitting, speaking, standing, pointing, composing one's countenance" and one could add mastery of English and Western table manners.

According to Wolfowitz, as quoted in Ingold (2002):

"The system is based on sets of precisely ranked or style-coded morphemes that are semantically equivalent but stylistically contrastive"

Important is an honorific vocabulary referring to the possessions, attributes, states and actions of persons, a vocabulary that includes honorific kin terms.

The Javanese perception of this is best summarized as per Errington's anecdote of an old Javanese man explaining:

Whenever two people meet they should ask themselves: "Who is this person? Who am I? What is this person to me? Balanced against one another on a scale: this is unggah-unggah- relative value

The understanding of honorifics is heavily emphasized by speakers of Javanese. High-strata Javanese will bluntly state: "to be human is to be Javanese". Those who are "sampun Jawa" or "already Javanese" are those who have a good grasp of social interaction and stratified Javanese language and applied to foreigners as well. Children, boors, simpletons, the insane, the immoral are durung Jawa: not yet Javanese.

Javanese speech is stratified. The three levels are:

- Ngoko is the common "everyday" speech.
- Krama is known as the polite and formal style. Krama is divided into two other categories:
  - Krama Madya: semi-polite and semi-formal
  - Krama Inggil: fully polite and formal

"Krama" is pronounced as [krɔmɔ]

All these categories are ranked according to age, rank, kinship relations, and "intimacy."

If a speaker is uncertain about the addressee's age or rank, they commence with krama inggil and adapt their speech strata according to the highest level of formality, moving down to lower levels. Krama is usually learned from parents and teachers, and Ngoko is usually learned from interacting with peers at a younger age.

Javanese women are expected to address their husbands in front of others, including their children in a respectful manner. Such speech pattern is especially more pronounced in areas where arranged marriage are prominent and within households where the husband is considerably older than the wife. Husbands generally address their wives by their first name, pet name, or "younger sibling" (dhik or mbak lik) while wives generally address their husbands as "elder brother" (mas).

High-strata children are expected to speak in krama inggil to both father and mother. This is less reinforced as the social strata descends, to the point of being near non-existent especially among the modern working class strata who may have the necessity of both parents working. At this point grandparents take the role of educating the children to correct language usage.

Women are considered the custodians of language and culture within the household.

This form of triglossia is also found in some neighboring Austronesian languages, such as Sundanese, Madurese, Balinese, and Sasak, but is absent in the national language, Indonesian (which is derived from Malay).

=== Korean ===
Korean honorific speech is a mixture of subject honorification, object exaltation, and the various speech levels. Depending on how these three factors are used, the speaker highlights different aspects of the relationship between the speaker, the subject, and the listener (who may also be the subject).

Korean honorifics can be added to nouns, adjectives, and verbs, and honorific styles of address may also be used. Korean pronouns may be dropped, or may be used in formal, familiar, or humble forms. Seven Korean speech levels can be used (though some are archaic) to express the level of politeness and formality to the audience. Each has its own set of verb endings.

Although Korean language has very similar honorifics system to Japanese language, there are differences between Korean and Japanese. For example, in Japan, the degree of intimacy largely reflects the use of honorifics, but in Korean, age and whether the other person is of higher status than oneself is more important than the degree of intimacy. In fact, in Japan, although this is limited to intimate relationships in private, there are many cases where students do not use honorifics towards their teachers at school. However, in contrast, in Korean, students must only use unconditional honorifics toward their teachers.

In South Korea and North Korea, except in very intimate cases, the use of honorifics depends on whether the other person's year of birth is one year (or more) older, or the same, or one year (or more) younger. However, some Koreans feel that it is unreasonable to distinguish between the use of honorifics based on a small age difference and try to distinguish between the use of honorifics based on intimacy within a small age difference. But their influence is weak. Also, regardless of whether or not honorifics are used, if the year of birth is more than a year apart, no matter how close people are, Korean people are not to think of each other as friends. It's often known that Korea is a custom that arose from being influenced more by Confucianism than Japan, but this is not true. Until the Joseon dynasty era, unlike today, on the Korean Peninsula, age was not considered as severe, so it was a culture of making friends within a small age gap.

The current Korean custom of deciding whether to use honorifics based on age in Korea was influenced by Japanese colonial occupation era. Before 1945, Japan operated its military and schools under a strict hierarchy, and the age hierarchy was stricter than it is now. These elements of the Japanese military system had a great influence on South and North Korean society. After Japan was defeated in 1945, this culture of arrangement was greatly weakened in Japanese society due to the disbandment of the Japanese military and the establishment of a civilian government, but in South Korea and North Korea, elements of the Japanese military permeated every corner of the society due to the influence of the dictatorship. Therefore, unlike other countries, it is common in South and North Korea to frequently ask people about their age. In particular, this phenomenon occurs because Park Chung-hee, who served in the military of Manchukuo, a puppet state of the Empire of Japan, transplanted the Japanese military's bad habits and military culture throughout South Korean society, and many remnants of this remain even after democratization was achieved in 1987.

The six commonly used speech styles from lowest to highest are:

1. plain style (haerache or 해라체)
  - formal
  - signals more social distance between the speaker and addressee than that when using intimate style
  - generally used when writing for a general audience
  - generally used in written language, but when it used in spoken language, it represents admiration.
2. banmal or intimate style (haeche or 해체)
  - informal
  - typically used with close friends, by parents to their children, by a relatively older speaker to a child, by children to children, or by youngsters to the same-ages.
  - recently, many children use banmal to their parents.
3. familiar style (hageche or 하게체)
  - more formal than banmal style
  - signals that the speaker will treat the listener with consideration and courtesy
  - typically used when the addressee is below the speaker in age or social rank (e.g. the speaker is at least thirty years old and the addressee is of college age)
  - The familiar style generally implies the speaker is showing authority therefore typically requires the speaker to be sufficiently mature.
  - Women seldom use familiar style because it is commonly associated with male authority.
  - Generally, it is used by senior citizens, getting out of use by most of people in everyday language.
4. semiformal or blunt style (haoche or 하오체)
  - more formal than familiar style with neutral politeness
  - used to address someone in an inferior position (e.g. age or social rank)
  - A speaker will use semiformal style with a stranger whose social rank is clear but not particularly lower compared to the speaker.
  - It is generally used by senior citizens, getting out of used by most of people in everyday language.
  - When semiformal style is used by young people, it also represents humorous sense, and is thought to be unsuitable for serious situations.
5. polite style (haeyoche or 해요체)
  - informal but polite.
  - typically used when the addressee is a superior (e.g. by children to their parents, students to teachers)
  - This is the most common speech style and is commonly used between strangers.
6. formal or deferential style (hapshoche or 합쇼체)
  - used to treat superiors with the most reserve and the most respect
  - commonly used in speeches delivered to large audiences, in news reports, radio broadcasts, business, and formal discussions.
  - in most of cases, books are written in plain style (herache), or formal style (hapshoche).
  - In some cases, speakers will switch between polite and formal styles depending on the situation and the atmosphere that one wishes to convey.

These six speech styles are sometimes divided into honorific and non-honorific levels where the formal and polite styles are honorific and the rest are non-honorific. According to Strauss and Eun, the two honorific speech levels are "prototypically used among non-intimate adults of relatively equal rank". Comparatively, the non-honorific speech levels are typically used between intimates, in-group members, or in "downward directions of address by the speaker to his or her interlocutor."

=== Khmer ===
Khmer employs a system of registers in which the speaker must always be conscious of the social status of the person spoken to. The different registers, which include those used for common speech, polite speech, speaking to or about royals and speaking to or about monks, employ alternate verbs, names of body parts and pronouns. As an example, the word for "to eat" used between intimates or in reference to animals is /siː/. Used in polite reference to commoners, it is /ɲam/. When used of those of higher social status, it is /pisa/ or /tɔtuəl tiən/. For monks the word is /cʰan/ and for royals, /saoj/. Another result is that the pronominal system is complex and full of honorific variations, just a few of which are shown in the table below.

| Situational usage | I/me | | | you | | | he/she/it | | |
|---|---|---|---|---|---|---|---|---|---|
| Intimate or addressing an inferior | អញ | ânh | [ʔaɲ] | ឯង | êng | [ʔaeŋ] | វា | véa | [ʋiə] |
| neutral | ខ្ញុំ | khnhŭm | [kʰɲom] | អ្នក | 'nâk | [neaʔ] | គេ | ké | [keː] |
| Formal | យើងខ្ញុំ, ខ្ញុំបាទ | yeung khnhŭm, khnhŭm bat | [jəːŋ kʰɲom] [kʰɲom ɓaːt] | លោក (or kinship term, title or rank) | loŭk | [loːk] | គាត់ | koăt | [kɔət] |
| Layperson to/about Buddhist clergy | ខ្ញុំព្រះករុណា | khnhŭm preăh kârŭna | [kʰɲom preah karunaː] | ព្រះតេជព្រះគុណ | preăh téch preăh kŭn | [preah ɗaec preah kun] | ព្រះអង្គ | preăh ângk | [preah ʔɑŋ] |
| Buddhist clergy to layperson | អាត្មា, អាចក្តី | atma, ach kdei | [ʔatʰmaː], [ʔaːc kɗəj] | ញោមស្រី (to female) ញោមប្រុស (to male) | nhoŭm srei (to female), nhoŭm brŏs (to male) | [ɲoːm srəj] (to female), [ɲoːm proh] (to male) | ឧបាសក (to male), ឧបាសិកា (to female) | ŭbasâk (to male), ŭbasĕka | [ʔuɓaːsɑk] [ʔuɓaːsekaː] |
| when addressing royalty | ខ្ញុំព្រះបាទអម្ចាស់ or ទូលបង្គុំ (male), ខ្ញុំម្ចាស់ (female) | khnhŭm preăh bat âmchăs or tul bângkŭm (male), khnhŭm mchăs (female) | [kʰɲom preah ɓaːt ʔɑmcah] or [tuːl ɓɑŋkom] (male), [kʰɲom mcah] (female) | ព្រះករុណា | preăh kârŭna | [preah karunaː] | ទ្រង់ | tróng | [trɔŋ] |

=== Modern Nahuatl ===
The Nahuatl language, spoken in scattered communities in rural areas of Central Mexico, utilizes a system of honorific speech to mark social distance and respect. The honorific speech of the Nahuatl dialects spoken in the Malinche Volcano area of Puebla and Tlaxcala in Mexico is divided into four levels: an "intimate or subordinating" Level I; a "neutral, socially distant" or "respectful between intimates" Level II; "noble" or "reverential" Level III; and the compadrazgo or "maximally social distant" Level IV.

Level I is typically used by non-age-mates and non-intimates and is unmarked in terms of prefixation or suffixation of the listener and verbs. Level II is marked by the prefix on- on the verb and is used between intimates. Some Nahuatl speakers have been observed to alternate between Level I and Level II for one listener. The use of both levels is believed to show some respect or to not subordinate the listener. Level III is marked by the prefix on-, the reflexive prefix mo-, and an appropriate transitivizing suffix based on the verb stem. Verbs in Level III may additionally be marked with the reverential suffix -tzinōa. Finally, Level IV is typically used between people who share a ritual kinship relationship (e.g., parent with godparent, godparent with godparent of the same child). Level IV is marked by a proclitic (i.e., word that depends on the following word and works similarly to an affix, such as the word "a" or "an" in English) ma. Another important aspect of Level IV is that it addresses the listener in 3rd person whereas Level I through III all use 2nd person forms. By using this 3rd person form, maximal social distance is achieved.

=== Mortlockese ===
The Mortlockese language is an Austronesian language spoken primarily on the Mortlock islands in Micronesia. In Mortlock culture, there is a hierarchy with chiefs called samwool. When speaking to these chiefs or to anyone of higher status, one must use honorifics (in Mortlockese called kapas pwéteete or kapas amáfel) in order to convey respect. In the Mortlockese Language, there are only two levels of speaking—common language and respectful language(honorifics). While respectful language is used when speaking to people of higher status, common language is used when speaking to anyone of the same or lesser status. One example showing the difference between respectful and common language can be seen in the word sleep. The word for 'sleep' using common language is maúr, while it is saipash using respectful language. Along with the respectful language, there are formal greetings called tiirou or fairo that are used in meetings and gatherings. In English, some examples of formal greetings would be "good evening" or "it's a pleasure to meet you" or "how are you." These formal greetings not only use words, but also gestures. It is the combination of the words and gestures that create the tiirou or fairo (formal greeting). In English, a formal greeting like this would be like saying "nice to meet you" while offering a handshake.

=== Pohnpeian ===
In Pohnpeian, honorific speech is especially important when interacting with chiefs and during Christian church services. Even radio announcements use honorifics, specifically bystander honorifics, because a chief or someone of higher status could potentially be listening. Pohnpeian honorific speech consists of:

- status-lowering (humiliative) speech
- status-raising (exaltive) speech

Honorific speech is usually performed through the choice of verbs and possessive classifier. There are only status-raising nouns but none for status lowering; there are only status-lowering pronouns but none for status-raising.

The construction of possessive classifiers depends on ownership, temporality, degrees of control, locative associations, and status. In addition to status-rising and status-lowering possessive classifiers, there are also common (non-status marked) possessive classifiers. Status-rising and status-lowering possessive classifiers have different properties of control and temporality. Common possessive classifiers are divided into three main categories – relatives, personal items, and food/drink.

Given that rank is inherited matrilineally, maternal relatives have specific classifiers, but paternal relatives do not. Personal items that are in close contact with the higher ranks are marked with honorific language. Food is related to social ranking; there is a hierarchy of food distribution. The best share of food is first distributed to the chief and people of higher status. In possessive constructions, food is linked to low-status possession, but not as heavily link to high-status possession. Tungoal 'food/eating' is used for all categories of low-status possessives; however, the most widely used high-status classifier, sapwelline 'land/hand' is not semantically connected to food. There are separate terms for food of high-status people—koanoat, pwenieu, and sak. On Pohnpei, it is also important to follow a specific order of serving food. The higher-ranked people eat first, both in casual family settings and community events. The lower-status people receive the "leftovers" or the weaker portion.

=== Vietnamese ===
==== Kinship terms ====
Kinship terms in Vietnamese have become grammaticalized to a large extent and thus have developed grammatical functions similar to pronouns and other classifiers. In these cases, they are used as honorifics or pejoratives. Kinship terms may also, of course, be used with a lexical meaning like other nouns.

===== Pronominal function =====
When used with a pronominal function, kinship terms primarily indicate the social status between referents in a discourse, such as between the speaker and the hearer, between speaker and another referent, etc. Included within the notion of social status are classifications of age, sex, relative social position, and the speaker's attitude.

For example, one can express the meaning of I love you in Vietnamese using many different pronouns.

- Anh yêu em (male to female [or younger male] lover)
- Em yêu anh (female [or younger male] to male lover)
- Mẹ yêu con (mother to child)
- Con yêu mẹ (child to mother)

The most common terms of reference are kinship terms, which might differ slightly in different regions.

When addressing an audience, the speaker must carefully assess the social relationship between him/her and the audience, difference in age, and sex of the audience to choose an appropriate form of address. The following are some kinship terms of address that can be used in the second-person sense (you). They all can also be used in the first-person sense (I), but if they're not marked by (S) the usage is limited to the literal meaning:

- Ông: grandfather, used as a term of respect for a man senior to the speaker and who is late middle age or older
- Bà: grandmother, used as a term of respect for a (usually married) woman senior to the speaker and who is late middle age or older
- Bá: parent's older sister, used to address a woman slightly older than one's parents or wife of father's older brother or wife of mother's older brother.
- Bác: parent's older brother or sister, used to address a man/woman slightly older than one's parents or husband of father's older sister or husband of mother's older sister.
- Cô: father's sister, used to address a younger woman or a woman as old as one's father; also used to address a female teacher regardless of relative age
- Cậu: mother's brother, used to address a younger man or a man as old as one's mother
- Dì: mother's sister, used to address a younger woman or a woman as old as one's mother; also used to address one's stepmother
- Chú: father's younger brother, used to address a man slightly younger than one's father or husband of father's younger sister.
- Thím: wife of father's younger brother.
- Mợ: wife of mother's younger brother.
- Dượng: husband of father's older sister; also used to address one's stepfather
- Anh: older brother, for a slightly older man, or for the man in a romantic relationship. (S)
- Chị: older sister, for a slightly older woman. (S)
- Em: younger sibling, for a slightly younger person, or for the woman [or younger man] in a romantic relationship. (S)
- Bố/Ba/Cha: father
- Mẹ/Má/Mợ: mother
- Con: child; also used in some regions to address a person as old as one's child
- Cháu: nephew/niece, grandson/granddaughter; used to address a young person of around such relative age

Using a person's name to refer to oneself or to address another is considered more personal and informal than using pronouns. It can be found among close friends or children.

=== Wuvulu-Aua ===
In Wuvulu grammar, the honorific dual is used to convey respect, especially towards in-laws. The second person dual pronoun, amurua literally translates to 'you two', but can also be used as an honorific to address one. This communicates to the individual being spoken to is worth the respect of two individuals. It is undocumented if there are other honorifics greater than this one.

Ex. Mafufuo, meru. 'Good Morning, you two.'

Note: Meru is the shortened version of amurua.

This sentence can be used to speak with one or two people.

== See also ==
- Deixis
- Hedge (linguistics)
- Indexicality
- Pragmatics
- Politeness
