= Pronouns in Korean =

Words in Korean that substitute for a noun or noun phrase

Korean pronouns pose some difficulty to speakers of English due to their complexity. The Korean language makes extensive use of speech levels and honorifics in its grammar, and Korean pronouns also change depending on the social distinction between the speaker and the person or persons spoken to.

In general, Koreans avoid using second person pronouns (both singular and plural), especially when using honorific forms.

== Overview of pronouns ==
	Singular	Plural
First person	저 (jeo), 나 (na)	저희 (jeohui), 저희들 (jeohuideul), 우리 (uri), 우리들 (urideul)
Second person	너 (neo), 자네 (jane), 그대 (geudae), 당신 (dangsin)	너희 (neohui), 너희들 (neohuideul), 너네 (neone), 너네들 (neonedeul), 자네들 (janedeul), 그대들 (geudaedeul), 당신들 (dangsindeul)
Third person (There are no third person pronouns, but the following third person pronouns, especially the female ones have restrictive use in certain writing genres.)	그(m/f), 그녀(f) (geu/geunyeo), 그이(m/f) (geu-i)	그들(m/f), 그녀들(f) (geudeul/geunyeodeul)

For each pronoun there is a humble/honorific and an informal form for first and second person. In the above table, the first pronoun given is the humble one, which one would use when speaking to someone older or of high social status. Dangsin (당신) is also sometimes used as the Korean equivalent of "dear" as a form of address. Also, whereas uses of other humble forms are straightforward, dangsin must be used only in specific social contexts, such as between two married partners. In that way, it can be used in an ironic sense when used between strangers, usually during arguments and confrontations. It is worth noting that dangsin is also an honorific third-person pronoun, used to refer to one's social superior who is not present.

There are no pure third-person pronoun systems in Korean. Unlike in English, Korean allows any part of a sentence except for the verb to be omitted when context is clear, which is usually done instead of using pronouns. It also uses personal names, titles, or kinship terms to refer to third persons in both oral and written communication. For this reason, repetitive use of names or titles in a discourse is allowed in Korean, which is very different from other languages such as English. For translation and creative writing, there is restrictive use of third-person pronouns"geu"(그) and "geu-nyeo" (그녀). A gender-neutral third person pronoun, geu (그), which was originally a demonstrative, meaning 'that' could mean she or he. The second has been coined in the combination of the demonstrative "geu" (그) [geu] "that" and 녀(nyeo) "woman" to refer anaphorically to a third person female. Although, in recent years, the pronoun geu-nyeo (그녀) is slowly gaining ground as a female counterpart from the influence of translations from European languages, it is usually restricted to specific styles of written language because Korean generally uses subjectless or modifier + noun constructions.

== Pronouns in detail ==
Korean has personal pronouns for the 1st and 2nd person, with distinctions for honorifics, and it prefers demonstrative pronouns in the 3rd person, which make a three-way distinction between close, distant, and previously mentioned.

Personal pronouns
	singular	plural
1st person familiar	나 (na)	우리 (uri) 우리들 (urideul)
2nd person familiar	너 (neo)	너희 (neohui) 너희들 (neohuideul)
3rd person familiar	그 (geu)	그들 (geudeul)
1st person humble	저 (jeo)	저희 (jeohui) 저희들 (jeohuideul)
2nd/3rd person respectful	(see below)	

The plural suffix -deul is also used with pronouns, both if it is necessary, as in geudeul (그들, "they"), and sometimes in some cases, like urideul (우리들), in which it is redundant.

Geu (그) has a range of meanings, "he", "she", or "it". Ambiguity and the ability of the Korean language to drop pronouns which can be reconstructed from context make geu be seldom used by itself, but it has enjoyed a revival recently as the translation of "he" in works translated from European languages.

The monosyllabic pronouns na (나), neo (너), and jeo (저), add -i (이) or -i ga (이가) rather than the expected -ga (가) to form the nominative case (see below). That produces the forms nae (내), ne (네), and je (제).

Additionally, because many Koreans have lost the distinction between the vowels ae (애) and e (에), ne (네, "you") is dissimilating to ni (니).

In colloquial Korean, the topic forms naneun (나는, "me") and neoneun (너는, "you") are often pronounced and sometimes written as nan (난, "me") and neon (넌, "you").

Similarly, the accusative forms nareul (나를) and neoreul (너를) tend to become nal (날) and neol (널). The possessives na-ui (나의, "my"), neo-ui (너의, "your"), and jeo-ui (저의, "my") have the alternate forms nae (내), ne (네), and je (제).

The classifier jjog (쪽, "side") is also used when referring to people. Ijjog (이쪽, "this side") then means "this person, these people" (that is, he, she, or they), but it is further extended via "our side" as a polite form for "us" or "me".

Demonstratives
	Prefix	Object	Place
Near	i- 이	igeot 이것 "this"	igot 이곳, yeogi 여기 "here"
Given	geu- 그	geugeot 그것 "that"	geogi 거기 "there"
Far	jeo- 저	jeogeot 저것 "that"	jeogi 저기 "yonder"
Which?	eoneu 어느	mueot 무엇 "what?"	eodi 어디 "where?"

The "given" series is often called "medial" and is said to be close to the addressee rather than the speaker. However, they actually refer to referents already established in the conversation, whether near or far. (I.e., they are actually anaphoric, not demonstrative.) With new referents, the near or far forms will be used.

In colloquial speech, the object words, composed of the prefix followed by the generic noun classifier geos (것), frequently omit the final s (pronounced t), with proximate igeos (이것) becoming igeo (이거) That occurs before case clitics as well, with the nominative form igeos-i (이것이) becoming ige (이게), topical igeos-eun (이것은) becoming igeon (이건), and accusative igeos-eul (이것을) becoming igeol (이걸, "this").

In colloquial Korean, interrogative mu-eos (무엇) contracts to mwo (뭐, "what") (often pronounced meo, as w tends to drop after m), and the accusative mu-eos-eul (무엇을) contracts to mwol (뭘, "what"). In literature, another set of contraction for mu-eos is available for senior or archaic speakers: "mu-eo" (무어) for mu-eos, "mu-e" (무에) for mu-eos-i, "mu-eol" (무얼) for mu-eos-eul. In addition is "mwos" (뭣), seldom used.

The word for "who" is nugu (누구) whose nominative is nuga (누가). "How many" is myeoch (몇).

An archaic alternative for nuga is "nwi" (뉘).

== Second person reference ==
Korean has a T-V distinction in the second person. Neo (너) is the pronoun corresponding to Latin tu, but instead of a single equivalent to vos, several strategies of pronoun avoidance are used:

- Leaving out the subject of the sentence if it can be implied by the context. In English, sentences need explicit subjects, but this is not so in conversational Korean, since it is a null-subject language.
- Using the person's name when talking to someone younger. With older people, it is custom to use either a title or kinship term (see next point).
- Using a kinship term: 언니 (eonni, "older sister" if speaker is female), 누나 (nuna, "older sister" if speaker is male), 오빠 (oppa, "older brother" if speaker is female), 형 (hyeong, "older brother" if speaker is male), 아줌마 (ajumma, "middle-aged woman"), 아주머니 (ajumeoni, also "middle aged woman" but more polite), 아저씨 (ajeossi, "middle-aged man"), 할머니 (halmeoni, "grandmother") or 할아버지 (harabeoji, "grandfather"). In Korea, it is common to use kinship terms for people who are not family at all. The term 아가씨 (agassi, "young lady") is preferable when addressing a young girl of unknown age. It is seen mostly used in public places like restaurants, but it will also sometimes be used by men in pick-up lines. By definition, the actual difference between 아가씨 and 아줌마 reside in marriage status and not age.
- Using the appropriate title, usually ending in -nim: seonsaengnim ( 선생님, "teacher" although it is also often used as a general honorific term for other professions like managers) or gwajangnim (과장님 "director"), etc.
- Using the plural yeoreobun (여러분, "ladies and gentlemen") where applicable.

If none of the above is possible, an honorific common noun, such as dangsin (당신, "said body") or jane (자네, "oneself") (used for "you" in the familiar speech level). The pseudo-pronoun dangsin is actually a noun, from the Sino-Korean loanword 當身 "the aforementioned body". There are many such pseudo-pronouns in Korean.

The methods are ambiguous: they can indicate a third person as well as a second person. For an honorific noun to be interpreted as a second person pronoun, it must agree with the speech level of the verb: the level of respect used must be consistent throughout the sentence. Korean verbs reflect the social status of the person being spoken to so if that same person or group of people listening is also mentioned in the sentence, neither reference should be higher than the other.

A lowly noun used with a high speech level, or an honorific noun used with a low speech level, will be interpreted as a third person pronoun.

For example, jane is used for "you" in the familiar speech level and is appropriate only as long as the familiar speech level itself is. The familiar speech level is used to talk in a friendly way to close friends and family who are younger or subordinate. In situations for which that speech level would be inappropriate or insulting, jane is too.

Even when the pronoun used and the speech level agree, there is still some possible ambiguity, but it can be resolved by context.

== See also ==
- Korean language
- Korean grammar
- Korean honorifics
- Korean numerals
