= Imperative mood =

Grammatical mood

The imperative mood is a grammatical mood that forms a command or request.

The imperative mood is used to demand or require that an action be performed. It is usually found only in the present tense, second person. They are sometimes called directives, as they include a feature that encodes directive force, and another feature that encodes modality of unrealized interpretation.

An example of a verb used in the imperative mood is the English phrase "Go." Such imperatives imply a second-person subject (you), but some other languages also have first- and third-person imperatives, with the meaning of "let's (do something)" or "let them (do something)" (the forms may alternatively be called hortative and jussive).

Imperative mood can be denoted by the glossing abbreviation imp. It is one of the irrealis moods.

== Formation ==
Imperative mood is often expressed using special conjugated verb forms. Like other finite verb forms, imperatives often inflect for person and number. Second-person imperatives (used for ordering or requesting performance directly from the person being addressed) are most common, but some languages also have imperative forms for the first and third persons (alternatively called cohortative and jussive respectively).

In English, the imperative is formed using the bare infinitive form of the verb (see English verbs for more details). This is usually also the same as the second-person present indicative form, except in the case of the verb to be, where the imperative is be while the indicative is are. (The present subjunctive always has the same form as the imperative, although it is negated differently – the imperative is negated using do not, as in "Don't touch me!"; see do-support. Occasionally do is not used: Dare not touch me!) The imperative form is understood as being in the second person (the subject pronoun you is usually omitted, although it can be included for emphasis), with no explicit indication of singular or plural. First and third person imperatives are expressed periphrastically, using a construction with the imperative of the verb let:

- Let me (Let's) see. (internal monologue equivalent to a first person singular imperative)
- Let us (Let's) go. (equivalent to a first person plural imperative)
- Let us be heard. (royal we in an equivalent to a first person passive imperative; also constructions like "We are to be heard")
- Let him/her/it/them run. (equivalent to a third person imperative; constructions with may are also used)
- Let him/her/it/them be counted. (equivalent to a third person passive imperative)

== Other languages ==
Other languages such as Latin, French and German have a greater variety of inflected imperative forms, marked for person and number, their formation often depending on a verb's conjugation pattern. Examples can be found in the specific language sections below. In languages that make a T–V distinction (tu vs. vous, du vs. Sie, tu vs. você, tú vs. usted and vos, etc.) the use of particular forms of the second person imperative may also be dependent on the degree of familiarity between the speaker and the addressee, as with other verb forms.

The second person singular imperative often consists of just the stem of the verb, without any ending.

For example, Te Reo Māori has the imperative me, which in addition to being put in front of sentences to command (e.g. Me horoi ō ringaringa; "(you must) wash your hands"), is used to assert the imperative mood in sentences that would be translated as "let's (let us)" in English. An example of this is Me haere tāua, which translates to "let us (you and me) go", but the "us" component goes last.

== Syntax and negation ==
Imperative sentences sometimes use different syntax than declarative or other types of clauses. There may also be differences of syntax between affirmative and negative imperative sentences. In some cases the imperative form of the verb is itself different when negated. A distinct negative imperative form is sometimes said to be in prohibitive mood (abbreviated proh).

Negative imperatives tell the subject to not do something. They usually begin with the verb "don't" or the negative form of a verb. e.g., example, "Don't be like that."

Many languages, even not normally null-subject languages, omit the subject pronoun in imperative sentences, as usually occurs in English (see below). Details of the syntax of imperative sentences in certain other languages, and of differences between affirmative and negative imperatives, can be found in some of the other specific language sections below.

In writing, imperative phrases and sentences may terminate in an exclamation mark (!).

== Usage ==
Imperatives are used principally for ordering, requesting or advising the listener to do (or not to do) something: "Put down the gun!", "Pass me the sauce", "Don't go too near the tiger." They are also often used for giving instructions as to how to perform a task: "Install the file, then restart your computer". They can sometimes be seen on signs giving orders or warnings "Stop", "Give way", "Do not enter".

The use of the imperative mood may be seen as impolite, inappropriate or even offensive in certain circumstances. In polite speech, orders or requests are often phrased instead as questions or statements, rather than as imperatives:

- Could you come here for a moment? (more polite than "Come here!")
- It would be great if you made us a drink. (for "Make us a drink!")
- I have to ask you to stop. (for "Stop!")

Politeness strategies (for instance, indirect speech acts) can seem more appropriate in order not to threaten a conversational partner in their needs of self-determination and territory: according to some strands of politeness theory the partner's negative face should not appear threatened. As well as the replacement of imperatives with other sentence types as discussed above, there also often exist methods of phrasing an imperative in a more polite manner, such as the addition of a word like please; or a phrase like if you could; or substituting one directive for another, as in the change from will to may, e.g., "you will do that" becomes "you may / can do that".

Imperatives are also used for speech acts whose function is not primarily to make an order or request, but to give an invitation, give permission, express a wish, make an apology, et cetera:

- Come to the party tomorrow! (invitation)
- Eat the apple if you want. (permission)
- Have a nice trip! (wish)
- Pardon me. (apology)

When written, imperative sentences are often, but not always, terminated with an exclamation mark.

First person plural imperatives (cohortatives) are used mainly for suggesting an action to be performed together by the speaker and the addressee (and possibly other people): "Let's go to Barbados this year", "Let us pray". Third person imperatives (jussives) are used to suggest or order that a third party or parties be permitted or made to do something: "Let them eat cake", "Let him be executed".

There is an additional imperative form that is used for general prohibitions, consisting of the word "no" followed by the gerund form. The best known examples are "No Smoking" and "No Parking". This form does not have a positive form; that is, "Parking" by itself has no meaning unless used as a noun when it shows that parking is permitted.

The following sentences demonstrate several different forms of the imperative mood.

- In the second person without personal pronouns: "Go to your cubicle!"
- With reflexive pronouns: "Give yourself a break."
- With a direct object: "Hit the ball."
- Referring to third-person objects of the main verb: "Okay. The test is over now. They win. Let them go back to the recovery annex. For their cake."
- As an affirmative imperative (also called positive imperative form): "Go for it!"
- As a negative imperative (also called a negative command): "Don't do that!"
- Expressing wishes: "Let's go team-name!"
- In future tense: "You will behave yourself."

== In particular languages ==
For more details on imperatives in the languages listed below, and in languages that are not listed, see the articles on the grammar of the specific languages.

=== Latin ===
Latin regular imperatives include:

infinitive	2nd person singular	2nd person plural
amāre (to love)	amā	amāte
monēre (to advise/warn)	monē	monēte
audīre (to hear)	audī	audīte

The negative imperative is formed with the infinitive of the verb, preceded by the imperative of nōlle (to not want):

	negative imperative	positive imperative
2nd person singular	nōlī stāre (don't stand)	stā (stand)
2nd person plural	nōlīte stāre	stāte

For third-person imperatives, the subjunctive mood is used instead.

In Latin there is a peculiar tense in the imperative, which is the future tense that is used when the speaker wants the mandate to be fulfilled in the future. This tense is used mainly in laws, wills, precepts, etc. However, it is conjugated only with the third and second person singular and plural which carries as a gramme or ending -tō for the second and third person singular, -tōte for the second person plural and -ntō for the third person plural. On the other hand, in other languages of the world there is a distinctive imperative, which also has a future value, but with a previous meaning and this is the so-called past imperative that appears in the French and Greek languages as a point of reference. See Latin conjugation.

Example verb conjugations in the imperative of future tense
		amare	delere	legere	audire
singular	2nd person	amatō	delētō	legītō	audītō
singular	3rd person	amatō	delētō	legītō	audītō
plural	2nd person	amātōte	delētōte	legītōte	audītōte
plural	3rd person	amantō	delentō	leguntō	audiuntō

Sentence examples of the future imperative:

- Facito voluntatem patris mei. (You will do my father's will.)
- Numquam iuranto in falso. (They will not swear falsely.)
- Ne occidito fratrem tuum. (You will not kill your brother.)
- Facito quae dico vobis. (You will do what I tell you.)
- Auditote quae dico vobis. (You will listen to what I say.)

=== Germanic languages ===
==== English ====
English usually omits the subject pronoun in imperative sentences:

- You work hard. (indicative)
- Work hard! (imperative; subject pronoun you omitted)

However, it is possible to include the you in imperative sentences for emphasis.

- You do that buddy!

English imperatives are negated using don't (as in "Don't work!") This is a case of do-support as found in indicative clauses; however in the imperative it applies even in the case of the verb be (which does not use do-support in the indicative):

- You are not late. (indicative)
- Don't be late! (imperative)

It is also possible to use do-support in affirmative imperatives, for emphasis or (sometimes) politeness: "Do be quiet!", "Do help yourself!".

The subject you may be included for emphasis in negated imperatives as well, following don't: "Don't you dare do that again!"

==== Dutch ====
A peculiar feature of Dutch is that it can form an imperative mood in the pluperfect tense. Its use is fairly common:

- Had gebeld! (You should have called!, If only you had called)
- Was gekomen! (You should have come!, If only you had come)

==== German ====
German verbs have a singular and a plural imperative. The singular imperative is equivalent to the bare stem or the bare stem + -e. (In most verbs, both ways are correct.) The plural imperative is the same as the second-person plural of the present tense.

- Sing! or: Singe! – said to one person ("Sing!")
- Singt! – said to a group of persons ("Sing!")

In order to emphasize their addressee, German imperatives can be followed by the nominative personal pronouns du ("thou; you SG") or ihr ("you PL"), respectively. For example: "Geh weg!" – "Geh du doch weg!" ("Go away!" – "Why, you go away!").

German has T/V distinction, which means that the pronouns du and ihr are used chiefly towards persons with whom one is privately acquainted, which holds true for the corresponding imperatives. (For details see German grammar.) Otherwise, the social-distance pronoun Sie (you) is used for both singular and plural. Since there exists no actual imperative corresponding to Sie, the form is paraphrased with the third-person plural of the present subjunctive followed by the pronoun:

- Singen Sie! – said to one or more persons ("Sing!")
- Seien Sie still! – said to one or more persons ("Be quiet!")

Occasionally, the infinitive (Infinitiv or Infinitiv als Imperativ) may be used as a mild or polite imperative, in order to avoid directly addressing the person or to simplify the sentence's construction. Although sometimes used in spoken language, this form is most commonly used in general instructions and recipes. Examples include:

- Nicht rauchen! ("No smoking!")
- Pasta im Salzwasser sehr bissfest kochen und abtropfen lassen. ("Cook the pasta al dente and drain.")
- Bitte nicht berühren! ("Please do not touch!")

Like English, German features many constructions that express commands, wishes, etc. They are thus semantically related to imperatives without being imperatives grammatically:

- Lasst uns singen! (Let's sing!)
- Mögest du singen! (You may sing!)
- Du sollst singen! (You should sing!)

=== Romance languages ===
==== French ====
Examples of regular imperatives in French are mange (2SG), mangez (2PL) and mangeons (1PL, "let's eat"), from manger (to eat) – these are similar or identical to the corresponding present indicative forms, although there are some irregular imperatives that resemble the present subjunctives, such as sois, soyez and soyons, from être (to be). A third person imperative can be formed using a subjunctive clause with the conjunction que, as in qu'ils mangent de la brioche (let them eat cake).

French uses different word order for affirmative and negative imperative sentences:

- Donne-le-leur. (Give it to them.)
- Ne le leur donne pas. (Don't give it to them.)

The negative imperative (prohibitive) has the same word order as the indicative. See French personal pronouns § Clitic order for detail. Like in English, imperative sentences often end with an exclamation mark, e.g. to emphasize an order.

In French there is a very distinctive imperative which is the imperative mood of preterite tense also called (past imperative or imperative of future perfect), expresses a given order with previous future value which must be executed or fulfilled in a future not immediate, as if it were an action to come, but earlier in relation to another that will also happen in the future. However, this type of imperative is peculiar to French which has only one purpose: to order that something be done before the date or time, therefore, this will always be accompanied by a circumstantial complement of time. However, this imperative is formed with the auxiliary verb of the avoir compound tenses and with the auxiliary verb être that is also used to form the tenses composed of the pronominal verbs and some of the intransitive verbs, this means that the structure of the verb imperative in its entirety is composed.

Examples of Imperative of Preterite Tense
with the auxiliary avoir
	aimer	finir	ouvrir	recevoir	rendre	mettre
2SG	aie aimé	aie fini	aie ouvert	aie reçu	aie rendu	aie mis
1PL	ayons aimé	ayons fini	ayons ouvert	ayons reçu	ayons rendu	ayons mis
2PL	ayez aimé	ayez fini	ayez ouvert	ayez reçu	ayez rendu	ayez mis
with the auxiliary être
	aller	partir	venir	mourir	naître	devenir
2SG	sois allé	sois parti	sois venu	sois mort	sois né	sois devenu
1PL	soyons allés	soyons partis	soyons venus	soyons morts	soyons nés	soyons devenus
2PL	soyez allés	soyez partis	soyez venus	soyez morts	soyez nés	soyez devenus

- Soyez levés demain avant huit heures. (Get up tomorrow before eight o'clock.) [With the auxiliary être]
- Ayez fini le travail avant qu'il (ne) fasse nuit. (Finish the work before it gets dark.) [With the auxiliary avoir and optional expletive ne]
- Aie écrit le livre demain. (Write the book tomorrow.) [With the auxiliary avoir]
- Soyez partis à midi. (Leave at noon.) [With the auxiliary être]
- Ayons fini les devoirs à 6 h. (Let us complete homework at 6 o'clock.) [With the auxiliary avoir]

In English there is no equivalent grammatical structure to form this tense of the imperative mood; it is translated in imperative mood of present with previous value.

==== Spanish ====
In Spanish, imperatives for the familiar singular second person (tú) are usually identical to indicative forms for the singular third person. However, there are irregular verbs for which unique imperative forms for tú exist. vos (alternative to tú) usually takes the same forms as tú (usually with slightly different emphasis) but unique forms exist for it as well. vosotros (plural familiar second person) also takes unique forms for the imperative.

Infinitive	3rd person indicative	imperative				
Infinitive	3rd person indicative	tú	vos	usted	vosotros / vosotras	ustedes
comer	come	come	comé*	coma	comed*	coman
beber	bebe	bebe	bebé*	beba	bebed*	beban
tener	tiene	ten*	tené*	tenga	tened*	tengan
decir	dice	di*	decí*	diga	decid*	digan
* = unique verb that only exists for this imperative form

If an imperative takes a pronoun as an object, it is appended to the verb; for example, Dime (Tell me). Pronouns can be stacked like they can in indicative clauses:

- Me lo dices. (You tell me it or You tell it to me, can also mean You tell me as lo usually is not translated)
- Dímelo. (Tell me it, Tell it to me, Tell me)

Imperatives can be formed for usted (singular formal second person), ustedes (plural second person), and nosotros (plural first person) from the respective present subjunctive form. Negative imperatives for these pronouns (as well as tú, vos, and vosotros) are also formed this way, but are negated by no (e.g. No cantes, "Don't sing").

==== Portuguese ====
In Portuguese, affirmative imperatives for singular and plural second person (tu / vós) derive from their respective present indicative conjugations, after having their final -s dropped. (Note: There are some exceptions to this rule; mainly for phonetical reasons and for vós, which hold vós's archaic conjugation paradigm, -des.) On the other hand, their negative imperatives are formed by their respective subjunctive forms, as well as both affirmative and negative imperatives for treatment pronouns (você(s)) and plural first person (nós).

infinitive	indicative		imperative						
infinitive	tu	vós	affirmative		negative		você	vocês	nós
infinitive	tu	vós	tu	vós	tu	vós	você	vocês	nós
comer	comes	comeis	come	comei	não comas	não comais	(não) coma	(não) comam	(não) comamos
beber	bebes	bebeis	bebe	bebei	não bebas	não bebais	(não) beba	(não) bebam	(não) bebamos
ter	tens	tendes	tem	tende	não tenhas	não tenhais	(não) tenha	(não) tenham	(não) tenhamos
dizer	dizes	dizeis	diz(e)	dizei	não digas	não digais	(não) diga	(não) digam	(não) digamos

If a verb takes a pronoun, it should be appended to the verb:

- Diz(e)-me. (Tell me) Portugal/Brazil
- Me diz. (Tell me) Brazil (spoken)
- Diz(e)-mo. (Tell me it, Tell it to me)

=== Celtic languages ===
==== Welsh ====
In spoken Welsh most verbs can form two imperatives, both in the second person: one for singular and one for plural/polite singular. The singular imperative is formed by adding –a to the verbal-stem (gwel- → gwela 'see!') while the plural/polite form takes –wch: gwelwch 'see!'. In informal writing, the plural/polite form is often used to translate 'please' as in talwch yma '(please) pay here' (talwch is the plural/polite imperative form of talu 'to pay').

In literary Welsh there are imperatives for all persons and numbers, except for the first-person singular. These must often be translated using phrases in English: gwelwn 'let us see'; gwelent 'let them see'; wele 'let him/her/it see'; gweler 'let it be seen, it is to be seen'. In the literary language the second person singular suffix –a is often not used: gwela (spoken), but gwêl (literary); tala (spoken), but tâl (literary).

The five irregular Welsh verbs (bod, mynd, dod, cael and gwneud) also have irregular imperative forms which also differ between the spoken and literary languages.

Irregular verbs
		2nd person		3rd person		1st person	impersonal
		singular	plural	singular	plural	plural	impersonal
bod 'to be'	spoken	bydd(a)	byddwch				
bod 'to be'	literary	bydd(a)	byddwch	bydded, boed, bid	byddent	byddwn	bydder
mynd 'to go'		dos	ewch				
dod 'to come'	spoken	tyrd, dere	dewch, dowch				
dod 'to come'	literary	dere, tyrd, tyred	deuwch, dewch, dowch	deued, doed, deled	deuent, doent, delent	deuwn, down	deuer, doer, deler
gwneud 'to do, to make'		gwna	gwnewch				
cael 'to get'	literary (Note: cael has no imperative forms in the spoken language)	ca	cewch				

==== Irish ====
Irish has imperative forms in all three persons and both numbers, although the first person singular is most commonly found in the negative (e.g. ná cloisim sin arís "let me not hear that again").

=== Indic Languages ===
==== Hindi-Urdu ====
In Hindi-Urdu (Hindustani) the imperatives are conjugated by adding suffixes to the root verb. The negative and positive imperatives are not constructed differently in Hindustani. There are three negations that be used to form negative imperatives. They are:

- Imperative negation - mat मत مت (used with verbs in imperative mood)
- Indicative negation - nahī̃ नहीं نہیں (used with verbs in indicative and presumptive mood)
- Subjunctive negation - nā ना نا (used with verbs in subjunctive and contrafactual mood)

Often to soften down the tone of the imperatives, the subjunctive and indicative negation are used to form negative imperatives. Imperatives can also be formed using subjunctives to give indirect commands to the third person and to formal second person. A peculiar feature of Hindi-Urdu is that it has imperatives in two tenses; present and the future tense. The present tense imperative gives command in the present and future imperative gives command for the future. Hindi-Urdu explicitly marks grammatical aspects and any verb can be put into the simple, habitual, perfective, and progressive aspects. Each aspect in turn can be conjugated into five different grammatical moods, the imperative mood being one of them.

करना karnā کرنا (to do) conjugated into the imperative mood for all the four aspectual forms
			2nd person pronouns			Translation
			Intimate	Familiar	Formal	Translation
			तू tū تو	तुम tum تم	आप āp آپ	Translation
Simple aspect	Present	♀	कर kar کر	करो karo کرو	करिये kariye کرے	do nowǃ
Simple aspect	Present	♂	कर kar کر	करो karo کرو	करिये kariye کرے	do nowǃ
Simple aspect	Future	♀	करियो kariyo کریو	करना karnā کرنا	करियेगा kariyegā کریگا	do laterǃ
Simple aspect	Future	♂	करियो kariyo کریو	करना karnā کرنا	करियेगा kariyegā کریگا	do laterǃ
Habitual aspect	Present	♀	करता रह kartā rêh کرتا رہ	करते रहो karte raho کرتے رہو	करते रहिये karte rahiye کرتے رہے	keep doingǃ
Habitual aspect	Present	♂	करती रह kartī rêh کرتی رہ	करती रहो kartī raho کرتی رہو	करती रहिये kartī rahiye کرتی رہے	keep doingǃ
Habitual aspect	Future	♀	करता रहियो kartā rahiyo کرتا رہیو	करते रहना karte rêhnā کرتے رہنا	करते रहियेगा karte rahiyegā کرتے رہیگا	keep doing later as wellǃ
Habitual aspect	Future	♂	करती रहियो kartī rahiyo لڑتی رہیو	करती रहना kartī rêhnā کرتی رہنا	करती रहियेगा kartī rahiyegā کرتی رہیگا	keep doing later as wellǃ
Perfective aspect	Present	♀	किया रह kiyā rêh کیا رہ	किये रहो kiye raho کے رہو	किये रहिये kiye rahiye کے رہے	keep (it) done nowǃ
Perfective aspect	Present	♂	की रह kī rêh کی رہ	की रहो kī raho کی رہو	की रहिये kī rahiye کی رہے	keep (it) done nowǃ
Perfective aspect	Future	♀	किया रहियो kiyā rahiyo کیا رہیو	किये रहना kiye rêhnā کے رہنا	किये रहियेगा kiye rahiyegā کے رہیگا	keep (it) done laterǃ
Perfective aspect	Future	♂	की रहियो kī rahiyo کی رہیو	की रहना kī rêhnā کی رہنا	की रहियेगा kī rahiyegā کی رہیگا	keep (it) done laterǃ
Progressive aspect	Present	♀	कर रहा रह kar rahā rêh کر رہا رہ	कर रहे रहो kar rahe raho کر رہے رہو	कर रहे रहिये kar rahe rahiye کر رہے رہے	be/continue doingǃ
Progressive aspect	Present	♂	कर रही रह kar rahī rêh کر رہی رہ	कर रही रहो kar rahī raho کر رہی رہو	कर रही रहिये kar rahī rahiye کر رہی رہے	be/continue doingǃ
Progressive aspect	Future	♀	कर रहा रहियो kar rahā rahiyo کر رہا رہیو	कर रहे रहना kar rahe rêhnā کر رہے رہنا	कर रहे रहियेगा kar rahe rahiyegā کر رہے رہیگا	be/stay doingǃ
Progressive aspect	Future	♂	कर रही रहियो kar rahī rahiyo کر رہی رہیو	कर रही रहना kar rahī rêhnā کر رہی رہنا	कर रही रहियेगा kar rahī rahiyegā کر رہی رہیگا	be/stay doingǃ

==== Sanskrit ====
In Sanskrit, लोट् लकार, lōṭ lakāra is used with the verb to form the imperative mood. To form the negative, न, na or मा, mā (when the verb is in passive or active voice respectively) is placed before the verb in the imperative mood.

==== Bengali ====
Modern standard Bengali also has two tenses for the imperative: present and future. Like in Hindustani, the present imperative is used to give a command that is expected to be carried out immediately or very soon (e.g. "খাবার খাও", "Khabar khao", "eat food"), while the future imperative is used to give a command that is expected to be carried out at some point in the future (e.g. "স্কুল থেকে এশে খেও", "skul theke ese kheo", "eat after you come back from school").

The exact morphology of the Bangla future imperative varies based on which class a verb falls into, and each level of honorific (very familiar, familiar, honorific) has its own present and future imperative forms.

Each verb's class also determines the vowel changes that happen in the stem of the verb as it is conjugated.

In many eastern dialects of Bengali (e.g. Dhakaiya, Cumillan), the present imperative uses the same suffix for the honorific as the present indicative, i.e. -এন /en/ instead of -উন /un/. However, the indicative is distinguished from the imperative in present tense for the very familiar in these dialects, with -অস /ôs/ and -ইস /is/ respectively, whereas the standard uses the latter for both.

=== Other Indo-European languages ===
==== Greek ====
Ancient Greek has imperative forms for present, aorist, and perfect tenses for the active, middle, and passive voices. Within these tenses, forms exist for second and third persons, for singular, dual, and plural subjects. Subjunctive forms with μή are used for negative imperatives in the aorist.

present active imperative
singular	2nd person	λεῖπε
singular	3rd person	λειπέτω
plural	2nd person	λείπετε
plural	3rd person	λειπόντων

In ancient Greek, the general order (with the idea of duration or repetition) is expressed using the present imperative and the punctual order (without the idea of duration or repetition) using the aorist imperative.

==== Russian ====
The commanding form in Russian language is formed from the base of the present/future tense. The most common form of the second person singular or plural. The form of the second person singular in the imperative mood is formed as follows:

- A verb with a present stem ending in – j – the form of the second person singular of the imperative mood is equal to the base: читаj-у — читай, убираj-у — убирай, открываj-у — открывай, поj-у — пой.
- If the present stem ends in other consonant, the imperative ends in -и if the stress falls on the ending or in -ь if it falls on the stem: молч-у — молчи, сяд-у — сядь. Due to the positional changes of the consonants, the rule of thumb is to take the present stem from 3rd person plural: oтвеч-у — ответ-ят — ответь, нош-у — нос-ят — носи.
- Some verbs have irregular imperatives: ешь, будь, жди, иди.

The plural form is formed by adding -те to the singular form: читайте, молчите, ешьте. Rarely, first person plural imperatives are used with -те added to the positive mood form: пойдёмте играть!

Negative imperative is formed similarly with just prepending не to the sentence.

There are other ways of expressing imperative meanings in Russian (with particle да, with infinitive, with past tence verb) and other uses of imperative verb form (conditional statements, emphasizing contrast).

=== Non-Indo-European languages ===
==== Finnish ====
In Finnish, there are two ways of forming a first-person plural imperative. A standard version exists, but it is typically replaced colloquially by the impersonal tense.

Forms also exist for second and third person. Only first person singular does not have an imperative.

mennä (to go)
		singular	plural
1st person	standard form		menkäämme
1st person	colloquial		mennään
2nd person		mene	menkää
3rd person		menköön	menkööt

==== Hebrew ====
In classical Hebrew, there is a form for positive imperative. It exists for singular and plural, masculine and feminine second-person. The imperative conjugations look like shortages of the future ones. However, in modern Hebrew, the future tense is often used in its place in colloquial speech, and the proper imperative form is considered formal or of higher register.

The negative imperative in those languages is more complicated. In modern Hebrew, for instance, it contains a synonym of the word "no", that is used only in negative imperative (אַל), and is followed by the future tense.

The verb 'to write' in singular, masculine
	Future Indicative	Imperative / Prohibitive
Affirmative	tikhtov – תכתוב 'You will write'	ktov – כתוב 'Write!'
Negative	lo tikhtov – לא תכתוב 'You will not write'	al tikhtov – אל תכתוב 'Don't write!'

The verb 'to write' in singular, feminine
	Future Indicative	Imperative / Prohibitive
Affirmative	tikhtevi – תכתבי 'You will write'	kitvi – כתבי 'Write!'
Negative	lo tikhtevi – לא תכתבי 'You will not write'	al tikhtevi – אל תכתבי 'Don't write!'

The verb 'to dictate' in singular, masculine
	Future Indicative	Imperative / Prohibitive
Affirmative	takhtiv – תכתיב 'You will dictate'	hakhtev – הכתב 'Dictate!'
Negative	lo takhtiv – לא תכתיב 'You will not dictate'	al takhtiv – אל תכתיב 'Don't dictate!'

==== Japanese ====
Japanese uses separate verb forms as shown below.

For the verb kaku ('write')
Form	Indicative	Imperative / Prohibitive
Affirmative	書く kaku	書け kake
Negative	書かない kakanai	書くな kakuna

See also the suffixes 〜なさい (–nasai) and 〜下さい (–kudasai).

==== Korean ====
Korean has six levels of honorific, all of which have their own imperative endings. Auxiliary verbs 않다 anta and 말다 malda are used for negative indicative and prohibitive, respectively.

For the verb gada ('go'):
Level	Indicative Affirmative	Imperative	Indicative Negative	Prohibitive
(formal) Hasipsio-style	가십니다 gasimnida	가십시오 gasipsio	가지 않으십니다 gaji aneusimnida	가지 마십시오 gaji masipsio (Note: Verb and adjective stems that end in ㄹ l, including mal-, eliminate the last l before suffixes starting with l (not r), n, o, p, and s.)
Haeyo-style	가세요 gaseyo	가세요 gaseyo	가지 않으세요 gaji aneuseyo	가지 마세요 gaji maseyo
Hao-style	가시오 gasio	가시오 gasio	가지 않으시오 gaji aneusio	가지 마시오 gaji masio
Hage-style	가네 gane	가게 gage	가지 않네 gaji anne	가지 말게 gaji malge
Haera-style	간다 ganda	가라 gara	가지 않는다 gaji anneunda	가지 마라 gaji mara (Note: An imperative suffix -a(ra) contracts mal- to ma- exceptionally. The other verbs are not contracted by -a(ra).)
(informal) Hae-style	가 ga	가 ga	가지 않아 gaji ana	가지 마 gaji ma

==== Mandarin ====
Standard Chinese uses different words of negation for the indicative and the prohibitive moods.

For the verb 做 zuò ('do')
	Indicative	Imperative / Prohibitive
Affirmative	做 zuò	做 zuò
Negative	不做 búzuò	别做 biézuò

==== Turkish ====
For the imperative form, the second-person singular, Turkish uses the bare verb stem without the infinitive ending -mek/-mak. Other imperative forms use various suffixes. The second-person plural, which can also be used to express formality (See T–V distinction), uses the suffixes -in/-ın/-ün/-un. The second person double-plural, reserved for super formal contexts (usually public notifications), uses the suffixes -iniz/-ınız/-ünüz/-unuz. Third-person singular uses -sin/-sın/-sün/-sun. Third-person plural uses -sinler/-sınlar/-sünler/-sunlar (There is no third person double-plural in Turkish). First-person pronouns do not have imperative forms. All Turkish imperative suffixes change depending on the verb stem according to the rules of vowel harmony.

Imperative forms of the verb içmek (to drink, to smoke a cigarette or similar)
2nd-person	singular	İç (Drink)
2nd-person	plural	İçin (Drink)
2nd-person	double-plural	İçiniz (Drink, e.g. Soğuk içiniz "Drink cold" on soft drinks)
3rd-person	singular	İçsin (Let him/her drink)
3rd-person	plural	İçsinler (Let them drink)

Turkish also has a separate optative mood. Conjugations of the optative mood for the first-person pronouns are sometimes incorrectly said to be first-person imperatives. Conjugations of the optative mood for second and third-person pronouns exist, but are rarely used in practice.

Conjugations of the optative mood for pronouns
1st-person	singular	içeyim
1st-person	(double-)plural	içelim
2nd person	singular	içesin
2nd person	(double-)plural	içesiniz
3rd person	singular	içe
3rd person	plural	içeler

Negative imperative forms are made in the same way, but using a negated verb as the base. For example, the second person singular imperative of içmemek (not to drink) is içme (don't drink). Other Turkic languages construct imperative forms similarly to Turkish.

== See also ==
- Free choice inference
- Imperative logic
- Modality (natural language)
- Pragmatics
- Speech act
