= Korean speech levels =

Grammatical system of honorific formality

There are seven verb paradigms or speech levels in Korean, and each level has its own unique set of verb endings which are used to indicate the level of formality of a situation. Unlike honorifics – which are used to show respect towards someone mentioned in a sentence – speech levels are used to show respect towards a speaker's or writer's audience, or reflect the formality or informality of the situation. They represent a system of honorifics in the linguistic use of the term as a grammar system, distinct from honorific titles.

The names of the seven levels are derived from the non-honorific imperative form of the verb hada (하다; "to do") in each level, plus the suffix che (체), which means "style". Each Korean speech level can be combined with honorific or non-honorific noun and verb forms. Taken together, there are 14 combinations.

Some of these speech levels are disappearing from the majority of Korean speech. Hasoseo-che is now used mainly in movies or dramas set in the Joseon era and in religious speech. Hage-che is nowadays limited to some modern male speech, whilst Hao-che is now found more commonly in the Jeolla dialect and Pyongan dialect than in the Seoul dialect.

== Higher levels ==
=== Hasoseo-che ===
| Name | Hasoseo-che (하소서체) |
| Formality | very high |
| Politeness | high |
| Currency | uncommon |

Very formally polite
Traditionally used when addressing a king, queen, or high official.

When the infix op / saop, jaop (옵; after a vowel / 사옵, 자옵; after a consonant) or sap / jap (삽 / 잡) or sao / jao (사오 / 자오) is inserted, the politeness level also becomes very high. hanaida (하나이다) becomes haomnaida (하옵나이다; non-honorific present declarative very formally very polite), hasinaida (하시나이다) becomes hasiomnaida (하시옵나이다; honorific present declarative very formally very polite). The imperative form hasoseo (하소서) also becomes haopsoseo (하옵소서; non-honorific imperative very formally very polite) and hasiopsoseo (하시옵소서; honorific imperative very formally very polite). It is used now:

- in historical dramas
- in religious texts such as the Bible, Buddhist scriptures, etc.
- to address royalty

| Present | Honorific Present | 1st Person | 2nd Person |
|---|---|---|---|
| hanaida (하나이다) | hasinaida (하시나이다) | jeo (저) | a title, e.g. imgeum (임금) |

=== Hasipsio-che ===
| Name | Hasipsio-che (하십시오체) |
| Formality | high |
| Politeness | high |
| Currency | common |

Formally polite
This conversational style is generally called either the "formal" or the "formal polite". Another name for this is hapsyo-che or 합쇼체. This is a common style of speaking. A conversation with a stranger will generally start out in this style and gradually fade into more and more frequent haeyo-che. It is used

- between strangers at the start of a conversation
- among colleagues in more formal settings; for example, in work meetings
- by TV announcers
- to customers
- in certain fixed expressions like 만나서 반갑습니다 mannaseo bangapseumnida "Pleased to meet you"

| Present | Honorific Present | 1st Person | 2nd Person |
|---|---|---|---|
| hamnida (합니다) | hasimnida (하십니다) | jeo (저) | a title, e.g. seonsaengnim (선생님) |

== Middle levels ==
The middle levels are used when there is some conflict or uncertainty about the social status of one or both participants in a conversation. The hage-che and hao-che are being replaced by or merging with haeyo-che.

=== Haeyo-che ===
| Name | Haeyo-che (해요체) |
| Formality | low |
| Politeness | high |
| Currency | common |

Casually polite
This speech style is called the "polite" style in English. Like the 해체 Hae-che, it exhibits no inflection for most expected forms. Unlike other speech styles, basic conjugations for the declarative, interrogative and imperative forms are identical, depending on intonation and context or other additional suffixes. Most Korean phrasebooks for foreigners follow this speech style due to its simplicity and proper politeness. Second person pronouns are generally omitted in the polite speech styles. (See Korean pronouns.) It is used:

- In Korean phrasebooks for foreigners.
- Between strangers, especially those older or of equal age.
- Between colleagues
- By younger speakers as a less old-fashioned alternative to the hao-che.
- By men and women in Seoul as a less formal alternative to the hasipsio-che.

| Present | Honorific Present | 1st Person | 2nd Person |
|---|---|---|---|
| haeyo (해요) | haseyo (하세요) (common), hasyeoyo (하셔요) (rare) | jeo (저) | |

=== Hao-che ===
| Name | Hao-che (하오체) |
| Formality | high |
| Politeness | neutral |
| Currency | less common |

Formally neither polite nor impolite
This conversational style is called the "semi-formal", "middle", "formal lateral", or "authoritarian" style in English. In Seoul, the 쇼 -syo ending is frequently pronounced 수 su. It is similar to the 하십시오체 Hasipsio-che, but does not lower oneself to show humility. It basically implies "My status is as high as you so I won't be humble, but I still respect your status and don't want to make you feel offended" so it's still supposed to be polite yet never willing to lower one's head to please the listener. (e.g. In the medieval times, if two kings from different countries have a meeting, they both would use this speech style. A king can use this speech style to his courtiers to show a minimum level of courtesy, and the courtiers will think the king is using a refined language.) It was originally a refined, poetic style that people resorted to in ambiguous social situations. Until the end of the nineteenth century, it was used widely in the ways the polite style is used now; but with the emergence of the polite style, the range of the semiformal style narrowed, and it became a style used only with inferiors. Further, due to its over-use by authority figures during Korea's period of dictatorship, it became associated with power and bureaucracy and gained a negative connotation. Consequently, this style has almost completely fallen out of use in modern South Korea, and the generation of Koreans who came of age after democratization also conspicuously avoid using it. In North Korean standard Korean (munhwaŏ) it is still used when talking to equals who may be addressed by 동무 dongmu ("comrade"). It is used:

- Occasionally among the older generation, by civil servants, police officers, middle management, middle-aged people, and other people of intermediate social rank who have temporary authority over what would normally be considered their superiors
- Used in written language such as signs and public notices, in which case the imperative form is used.
- In historical dramas, where it gives the dialogue a more old-fashioned sound.
- In the North Korean standard language
- In the spoken form of certain dialects, such as the Hamgyŏng dialect.

| Present | Honorific Present | 1st Person | 2nd Person |
|---|---|---|---|
| hao (하오) | hasyo (하쇼), hasio (하시오) | na (나) | dangsin (당신) |

=== Hage-che ===
| Name | Hage-che (하게체) |
| Formality | neutral |
| Politeness | neutral |
| Currency | less common |

Neither formal nor casual, neither polite nor impolite
This conversational style is called the "familiar." It is intermediate in politeness between haeyo-che and hae-che. It is not used to address children, and is never used to address blood relatives. It is used only:

- By some older people when addressing younger people or especially in-laws in a friendly manner.
- Used for those under one's authority: by professors toward their students, by bosses toward their employees etc.
- Between adult male friends, occasionally.
- In novels

| Present | Honorific Present | 1st Person | 2nd Person |
|---|---|---|---|
| hane (하네) | hasine (하시네) | na (나) | jane (자네) |

== Lower levels ==
The hae-che and haera-che styles are frequently mixed together in the same conversation, so much so that it can be hard to tell what verb endings belong to which style. Endings that may be used in either style are:

- Question: -니?/-냐?/-느냐?
- Proposition: -자. (this is roughly equivalent to "let's" in English)
- Casual statement: -지. (this is roughly equivalent to "I suppose")
- Casual question: -지?. (this is roughly equivalent to "I wonder if" in English)
- Exclamation: -구나! -다!

=== Haera-che ===
| Name | Haera-che (해라체) |
| Formality | high |
| Politeness | low |
| Currency | common |

Formally impolite
This conversational style is generally called the "plain" style. In writing and quoting, the plain style is the equivalent of the third person. Any other written style would feel like a first-person account (that is, anything else would seem to be told in the main character's own voice). It is used:

- To close friends or relatives of similar age, and by adults to children.
- In impersonal writing (books, newspapers, and magazines) and indirect quotations ("She said that...").
- In grammar books, to give examples.
- In some exclamations.

| Present | Honorific Present | 1st Person | 2nd Person |
|---|---|---|---|
| handa (한다) | hasinda (하신다) | na (나) | neo (너) |

=== Hae-che ===
| Name | Hae-che (해체) |
| Formality | low |
| Politeness | low |
| Currency | common |

Casually impolite
This conversational style is called the "intimate" in English. Like the 해요체 Haeyo-che, it exhibits no inflection for most expected forms. Basic conjugations for the declarative, interrogative and imperative forms are identical, depending on intonation and context or other additional suffixes. It is used:

- Between close friends and relatives.
- When talking to children.

| Present | Honorific Present | 1st Person | 2nd Person |
|---|---|---|---|
| hae (해) (in speech), hayeo (하여) (in writing) | hasyeo (하셔) | na (나) | neo (너) |

== Endings ==
=== Formal Speech ===
==== Hasoseo-che ====
Raises the addressee very highly.

| Declarative mood (평서법) | Indicative | | -나이다 -naida |
| Declarative mood (평서법) | Indicative | Humble | -사옵나이다, -(으)옵나이다, -삽나이다, saomnaida, -(eu)omnaida, -samnaida |
| Declarative mood (평서법) | To indicate a reminder by conveying a fact that has been seen, heard, or experienced. | | -더니이다, -더이다 -deoniida, -deoida |
| Declarative mood (평서법) | To indicate a reminder by conveying a fact that has been seen, heard, or experienced. | | -사오리이다, -사오리다, -(으)오리이다 -saoriida, -saorida, -(eu)oriida |
| Interrogative mood (의문법) | Indicative | | -나이까 -naikka |
| Interrogative mood (의문법) | Indicative | Humble | -사옵나이까, -(으)옵나이까 -saomnaikka, -(eu)omnaikka |
| Interrogative mood (의문법) | To indicate a question about the other party's intentions for an action or state | | -사오리이까, 사오리까 -saoriikka, saorikka |
| Interrogative mood (의문법) | To indicate a question about the other party's intentions for an action or state | | -(으)오리이까, -(으)오리까 -(eu)oriikka, -(eu)orikka |
| Interrogative mood (의문법) | To ask the other party about the action he intends to do | | -(으)리이까, -리까 -(eu)riikka, -rikka |
| Interrogative mood (의문법) | To ask to reflect on past | | -더니이까, -더이까 -deoniikka, -deoikka |
| Imperative mood (명령법) | -(으)옵소서, -(으)소서 -(eu)opsoseo, -(eu)soseo | | |
| Propositive mood (청유법) | -(으)사이다 -(eu)saida | | |

==== Hasipsio-che ====
Raises the addressee highly.

| Declarative mood (평서법) | Indicative | -(스)ㅂ니다 -(seu)mnida | |
| Declarative mood (평서법) | Indicative | Humble | -(으/느)ㄴ뎁쇼 -(eu/neu)ndepsyo |
| Declarative mood (평서법) | Indicative | Humble | -(으)옵니다, -사옵니다-(eu)omnida, -saomnida |
| Declarative mood (평서법) | To describe a fact | | -(이)올시다 -(i)olsida |
| Declarative mood (평서법) | To express certainty in belief/assertion | | -(스)ㅂ지요/ㅂ죠 -(seu)bjiyo/bjyo |
| Interrogative mood (의문법) | Indicative | | -(스)ㅂ니까-(seu)mnikka |
| Interrogative mood (의문법) | Indicative | Humble | -사옵니까, -(으)옵니까-saomnikka, -(eu)omnikka-사오니까, -(으)오니까-saonikka, -(eu)onikka |
| Interrogative mood (의문법) | To ask the other party about the action he intends to do. | | -(으)리까 -(eu)rikka |
| Interrogative mood (의문법) | To express certainty in belief/assertion | | -(스)ㅂ지요 -(seu)pjiyo |
| Imperative mood (명령법) | | | -(으)ㅂ시오-(eu)psio |
| Propositive mood (청유법) | | | -(으)십시다, -(으)시지요, -(으)시라-(eu)sipsida, -(eu)sijiyo, -(eu)sira |
| Request | | | -(으)ㅂ시사-(eu)psisa |

==== Hao-che ====
Raises the addressee moderately.

| Declarative mood (평서법) | Indicative | -(으)오, -오/소 -(eu)o, -o/so |
| Declarative mood (평서법) | To show speaker already knows | -(ㄴ/는)다오, -(이)라오 -(n/neun)dao, -(i)rao |
| Declarative mood (평서법) | To express intention or conjecture | -(으)리다 -(eu)rida |
| Declarative mood (평서법) | To express experienced event/action | -(스)ㅂ디다 -(seu)bdida |
| Imperative mood (명령법) | | -(으)오, -(으)우-(eu)o, -(eu)u |
| Exclamatory mood (감탄법) | | -(는)구려, -(이)로구려-(neun)guryeo, -(i)roguryeo |

==== Hage-che ====
Lowers the addressee moderately.

| Mood | | Ending |
| Declarative mood (평서법) | Indicative | -네-ne |
| Declarative mood (평서법) | To indicate intention or conjecture | -(으)ㄹ레 -(eu)lle |
| Declarative mood (평서법) | To show speaker already knows | -(ㄴ/는)다네 -(n/neun)dane |
| Declarative mood (평서법) | To explain one's thoughts | -(으)ㄹ세, -(eu)lse |
| Declarative mood (평서법) | Connective ending | -(으/느)니 -(eu/neu)ni |
| Imperative mood (명령법) | | -게-ge |
| Interrogative mood (의문법) | Indicative | -나-na, -(으/느)ㄴ가-(eu/neu)ga |
| Interrogative mood (의문법) | To show the speaker guesses a certain situation | -(으)ㄹ런가 (eu)lleonga |
| Interrogative mood (의문법) | To strongly deny the preceding content by a question, meaning similar "How could that be ? " | -(으)ㄹ쏜가 -(eu)lssonga |
| Propositive mood (청유법) | | -(으)세, -(으)세나-(eu)se, -(eu)sena |
| Exclamatory mood (감탄법) | | -(으)ㄹ세, -(이)로세-(eu)lse, -(i)rose |
| Supposition | | -(으)ㄹ세-(eu)lse |

==== Haera-che ====
Lowers the addressee.

| Declarative mood (평서법) | Indicative | -(ㄴ/는)다 -(n/neun)da |
| Declarative mood (평서법) | To show speaker already knows | -(ㄴ/는)단다, -(이)란다 -(n/neun)danda, -(i)randa |
| Declarative mood (평서법) | Connective ending | -(이/었/겠)거니 -(i/eot/get)geoni |
| Declarative mood (평서법) | To present a fact the speaker realized anew from a person | -더라 -deora |
| Declarative mood (평서법) | To show the speaker guesses a certain situation | -(으)리라 -(eu)rira |
| Declarative mood (평서법) | To express intention | -(으)리로다 -(eu)riroda |
| Declarative mood (평서법) | To express certainty in belief/assertion | -(으)렷다 -(eu)ryeotda |
| Imperative mood (명령법) | | -어라, -(으)라, -도록 |
| Interrogative mood (의문법) | Indicative | -냐, -니 |
| Interrogative mood (의문법) | To judge that something is not likely to happen and ask something in response. | -(으)랴 |
| Interrogative mood (의문법) | To ask the listener in a friendly manner if he/she intends to accept a certain act which will be done for him/her. | -(으)련 |
| Interrogative mood (의문법) | To ask about the listener's personal experience of the past in a friendly manner. | -던 |
| Interrogative mood (의문법) | To ask what the listener experienced in the past. | -디 |
| Interrogative mood (의문법) | To complain about a certain fact | -(ㄴ/는)담, -남, -(이)람 |
| Interrogative mood (의문법) | To guess about something | -(으/느)ㄴ고 |
| Interrogative mood (의문법) | To confirm and ask questions about a previous suggestion or piece of advice. | -자면서 |
| Propositive mood (청유법) | | -자 |
| Propositive mood (청유법) | To advise the listener in a friendly manner to do a certain act together. | -자꾸나 |
| Propositive mood (청유법) | To permit gently or order mildly. | -(으)렴, -(으)려무나 |
| Intention (약속법) | | -(으)마 |
| Exclamatory mood (감탄법) | To imply a certain feeling in a newly learned fact. | -(는)구나, -(이)로구나, |
| Exclamatory mood (감탄법) | To indicate that the speaker notices or is impressed by a newly learned fact | -(는)군 |
| Exclamatory mood (감탄법) | To ask a question about a certain fact that is assumed to be already given. | -(ㄴ/는)다니 |
| Exclamatory mood (감탄법) | To express admiration | -(으)ㄹ데라니, |
| Exclamatory mood (감탄법) | To worry about something possibly happening. | -(으)ㄹ라, -(으)ㄹ세라 |
| Exclamatory mood (감탄법) | To emphasise a fact or statement | -(이)라니까 |
| Subjunctive mood (가정법) | | -(으)ㄹ진저 |

=== Informal Speech ===
==== Haeyo-che ====
Raises the addressee moderately.

| Declarative mood (평서법) | also used in Interrogative mood (의문법) Exclamatory mood (감탄법) Propositive mood (청유법) | -어요, -이에요/예요, -(이)여요, -(이)요[ |
| Imperative mood (명령법) | | -어요, -(으)세요, -(으)시어요 |

==== Hae-che ====
Lowers the addressee or does not raise the addressee.

| Declarative mood (평서법) | Indicative | -어, -(이)야 |
| Declarative mood (평서법) | To confirm something | -지, |
| Declarative mood (평서법) | To ask the listener again, or confirm what the speaker heard earlier. | -(ㄴ/는)다지 |
| Declarative mood (평서법) | To show speaker already knows | -(이)라지, |
| Declarative mood (평서법) | To refer to the reason, cause, or basis for the preceding statement that the speaker thought of. | -거든, -거들랑 |
| Declarative mood (평서법) | To express experienced event/action | -데 |
| Declarative mood (평서법) | To answer, omitting the question that should follow and finishing the sentence. | -고 |
| Declarative mood (평서법) | To indicate that no other way exists except for that. | -(으)ㄹ밖에 |
| Imperative mood (명령법) | | -어, -지 |
| Interrogative mood (의문법) | Indicative | -어, -(이)야, -(으)ㄹ까, |
| Interrogative mood (의문법) | To ask the listener in a friendly manner.To ask something that the speaker already knows to cross-check the information. | -지 |
| Interrogative mood (의문법) | To indicate a vague doubt. | -(으/느)ㄴ지 |
| Interrogative mood (의문법) | To ask if something uncertain will happen actually or to express | -(으)ㄹ는지 |
| Interrogative mood (의문법) | To ask the listener to try to guess and answer. | -게 |
| Interrogative mood (의문법) | To indicate the speaker's intention to do something in the future, or to ask for the listener's thoughts about that. | -(으)ㄹ래, |
| Interrogative mood (의문법) | To admire something while anticipating the listener's response. | -(으/느)ㄴ데 |
| Interrogative mood (의문법) | To ask casually about the expectation or assumption of an event. | -(으)려나 |
| Interrogative mood (의문법) | When the speaker asks himself/herself about his/her thoughts or asks for another person's opinion. | -(으)ㄹ거나 |
| Interrogative mood (의문법) | To confirm and asks questions about a fact that one heard. | -(ㄴ/는)다면서, -(이)라면서 |
| Exclamatory mood (감탄법) | Toi indicate that the speaker notices or is impressed by a newly learned fact | -(는)구먼 |
| Exclamatory mood (감탄법) | To talk about a certain result happening as one expected, while giving reasons for it. | -더라니, |
| Exclamatory mood (감탄법) | To express admiration | -(으)ㄹ데라니, -(으)ㄹ사 |
| Exclamatory mood (감탄법) | To express self talk that impress | -(이)로고, |
| Propositive mood (청유법) | To emphasise the suggestion to do a certain act together by repeating it. | -자니까 |
| Intention (약속법) | | -(으)ㄹ게 |
| Objective negation (객관부정법) | | -(으)ㄹ세말이지 |
| Monologue (독백) | To ask again or admiring an unexpected fact in surprise. | -(ㄴ/는)다니, -(이)라니 |
| Monologue (독백) | To say a newly learned fact with admiration. | -(으/느)ㄴ걸, |
| Monologue (독백) | To indicate a guess or assumption. | -(으)ㄹ걸, |
| Monologue (독백) | To emphasise one's remark, while reconfirming what was said earlier. | -(ㄴ/는)다니까, -(이)라니까 |
| Monologue (독백) | To strongly denying the fact of the preceding statement, or raising a question about it. | -(ㄴ/는)대, -나 |

== See also ==
- Korean honorifics
- Korean pronouns
