= Jussive mood =

Grammatical mood

The jussive (abbreviated jus) is a grammatical mood of verbs for issuing orders, commanding, or exhorting (within a subjunctive framework). English verbs are not marked for this mood, but the modal verb "should" is commonly used for the same purpose. The mood is similar to the cohortative mood, which typically applies to the first person by appeal to the object's duties and obligations, and the imperative, which applies to the second person (by command). The jussive however typically covers the first and third persons. It can also apply to orders by their author's wish in the mandative subjunctive, as in the English, "The bank insists that she repay her debt."

== Examples ==
=== Arabic ===
Classical and Standard Arabic verbs conjugate for at least three distinct moods in the imperfect: indicative, subjunctive and jussive.

The main use of this mood is in negative commands.

lā ta-ʔxuḏ-ø ḏālika l-laḥm
not 2SG.M-take-JUS that the-meat
'Don't take that meat.'

The jussive form is also used in past tense sentences negated by lam لم (but not mā ما).

lam ta-ʔkul-i d-dajāj
not.PAST 3SG.FEM-eat.NPFV-JUS.3SG.FEM the-chicken
'She didn't eat the chicken.'

It is also used after the preposition li- (لـ-, 'to') to express a command to a third person.

li-yaf‘al-hu
to-do.JUS.3SG.MASC-it
'Have him do it.'

=== Esperanto ===
The jussive mood can be expressed in Esperanto using the volitive verb form, which is made by adding -u to a verb stem.

Iru! (Go!)
Mi petis, ke li venu. (I asked him to come.)
Li parolu. (Let him speak.)
Ni iru. (Let's go.)
Mia filino belu! (May my daughter be beautiful!)

=== Finnish ===
In Finnish, the jussive forms the third person of the imperative mood. Its ending is -koon ~ -köön in the singular and -koot ~ -kööt in the plural. The jussive can be used to express speakers' positions or opinions that somebody is allowed to do something or that somebody is expected to do something.

Eläköön!
let-he/she/it-live
Hooray!

Noudattakoon
person-is-declared-to-obey
typical expression in legislative context

Tapahtukoon tahtosi
let-it-happen your-will
let thy will be done

=== German ===
In the German language, the jussive mood is expressed using the present subjunctive (named Konjunktiv I or Möglichkeitsform I in German). It is typical of formal documents or religious texts, such as the Bible. Because it was more common in past centuries, it has often survived in proverbs:

Es kehr-e jed-er vor sein-er eigen-en Tür.
It sweep-SBJV.PRS.3S everyone-M.NOM {in front of} his-F.DAT own-F.DAT door
Everyone should sweep in front of his own door (Everybody should mind his own business).

It is still common that recipes are written in jussive mood:

Man nehm-e drei Eier
One take-SBJV.PRS.3S three eggs
Take three eggs

Apart from that, jussive mood is still quite common in contemporary German. However, the pronouns he, she, and it might not be used directly; otherwise jussive would be mistaken for a dated form of courteous imperative. Instead, they will have to be replaced by "who", "someone", "everyone", "the new colleague" and so on:

We-r noch ein-e Karte brauch-t, meld-e sich bei mir
Whoever.NOM still a-F.NOM ticket need-IND.PRS.3S, report-SBJV.PRS.3S self at me.DAT
If someone still needs a ticket, just contact me.

Finally, an example for jussive that would have served as a courteous imperative when addressing people of lower, but not lowest, rank:

Komm-e Er her und helf-e Er mir!
come-SUBJ.SBJV.3S he.NOM here and help-SBJV.PRS.3S he.NOM me.DAT!
Come over and help me!

Note that Er is written in capital letters here. Even if this construction is not used anymore in common German, it will be recognized as being an imperative (German Wikipedia lists the example Sei Er nicht so streng! as a historic form of an imperative).

=== Hindi ===
For the non-aspectual verb forms, Hindi uses the subjunctive forms as imperatives for the formal 2nd person and the 3rd person singular and plural grammatical persons.

jussive mood - 2P formal

आप बैठे रहें
aap baiṭhe rahein
[you].DIR [sit].PTCP [stay].JUS
You keep sitting!

jussive mood - 3P singular

वो आये और लेके जाये
vo aaye aur leke jaaye
[he/she].DEM [come].JUS [and] [take].CONJ [go].JUS
(that) he come, take (it), and go!

jussive mood - 3P plural

{ये लोग} वो काम अभी करें
{ye log} vo kaam abhi karein
[they].DEM [that].DEM [work].DIR [now].ADV [do].JUS
(that) these people do that work now!

=== Latin ===
In the Latin language, the present subjunctive has a usage labelled the "jussive subjunctive" or coniunctivus iussivus that expresses 3rd-person orders:

- Adiuvet ("Let him help.")
- Veniant ("Let them come.")

A jussive use of the present subjunctive is also attested for the second person in sayings and poetry, as well as in early Latin.

- iniūriās fortūnae [...] relinquās ("Leave behind [...] the wrongs of Fortune", saying from Cicero's Tusculanae Disputationes)
- doceās iter ("Show us the way", poetry from Virgil's Aeneid)

=== Russian ===
The jussive mood in modern Russian serves as an imperative (for issuing orders, commanding or requesting), but covers third person instead of second person. It is always formed with a particle пусть, which is derived from the verb пускать (to let, to allow).

Imperative: Беги! (Run!)
Jussive: Пусть бежит (similar to Let him run)

=== Turkish ===
The jussive mood in Turkish serves as an imperative (for issuing orders, commanding or requesting), but covers third person (both singular and plural) instead of second person. The negative, interrogative and negative-interrogative forms are also possible.

Imperative: koş! (Run!)
Jussive: koşsun! (similar to Let him/her run or he/she shall run)
Jussive: koşsunlar! (similar to Let them run or they shall run)

Imperative: koşma! (Don't run!)
Jussive: koşmasın! (similar to Don't let him/her run or he/she shall not run)
Jussive: koşmasınlar! (similar to Don't let them run or they shall not run)
