= English honorifics =

Courtesy form of address

In the English language, an honorific is a form of address conveying esteem, courtesy or respect. These can be titles prefixing a person's name, e.g.: Mr, Mrs, Miss, Ms, Mx, Sir, Dame, Dr, Cllr, Lady, or Lord, or other titles or positions that can appear as a form of address without the person's name, as in Mr President, General, Captain, Father, Doctor, or Earl.

Many forms of honorifics are for members of the nobility, clergy, military, or royalty; these are found mainly in countries that are monarchies. These include "Your Majesty", "Your Royal Highness" or simply "Your Highness", which are used to address certain members of royalty and "My lord/lady" or "Your Lordship/Ladyship" to address a peer other than a Duke, who is referred to as "Your Grace".

== Common titles ==
- Master: (/ˈmɑːstər/) for boys and young men, or as a style for the heir to a Scottish peerage. It may also be used as a professional title, e.g. for the master of a college or the master of a merchant ship.
- Mr: (/ˈmɪstər/) for men, regardless of marital status, who do not have another professional or academic title. The variant Mister, with the same pronunciation, is sometimes used to give jocular or offensive emphasis, or to address a man whose name is unknown.
  - "Mr" is used with the name of some offices to address a man who is the office-holder, e.g. "Mr President"; "Mr Speaker", see "Madam" below for the equivalent usage for women.
- Messrs: is short for the French Messieurs, is a title used to refer to two or more men in a group.
- Miss: (/mɪs/) for girls, unmarried women, and (in the United Kingdom) married women who continue to use their maiden name (although "Ms" is often preferred for the last two). In the United Kingdom and in Ireland, it has traditionally been used in schools to address female teachers, regardless of marital status. It is also used, without a name, to address girls or young women and (in the United Kingdom) to address female shop assistants and wait staff.
- Mrs: (/ˈmɪsɪz/ in the United Kingdom, /ˈmɪsəz/ or /ˈmɪsəs/ in the United States generally, or /ˈmɪzəz/ or /ˈmɪzəs/ in the southern United States) for married women who do not have another professional or academic title, an abbreviation of Mistress. The variant Missus (/ˈmɪsəz/) is used in the United Kingdom to address a woman whose name is unknown. There are examples of professional women who were unmarried using the title Mrs, such as Mrs Crocombe, the Cook at Audley End House in the late 19th century.
- Ms: (/mɪz/ or /məz/) for women, regardless of marital status or when marital status is unknown.
- Mx: (/mɪks/ or /məks/) a gender neutral honorific for those who do not wish to specify their gender or who do not identify with Mr/Master or Ms/Mrs/Miss, for example if they are non-binary.

== Formal titles ==
- Sir: for men, formally if they have a British knighthood or if they are a baronet (used with first name or full name, never surname alone) or generally (used on its own) as a term of general respect or flattery, when it is equivalent in meaning to "Madam" for women (see below). Also traditionally used to address male teachers in British and Irish schools.
- Gentleman: originally a social rank, standing below an esquire and above a Yeoman. The term can now refer to any man of good, courteous conduct. It is only generally used as an honorific form of address in the plural ("gentlemen" if referring to a group of men, or as part of "ladies and gentlemen" if referring to a mixed group), with "sir" (or "ladies and sir") being used for the singular.
- Sire: a term of address for a male monarch, previously could be used for a person in a position of authority in general or a lord.
- Mistress is an archaic form of address for a woman, equivalent to Mrs. Used on its own, it was used to address the female head of a household. The titles Mrs, Miss, and Ms are abbreviations derived from Mistress. The term is no longer commonly used because of its connotative meaning: "mistress" is used to refer to a woman with whom a married man is having an affair.
- Madam or Ma'am (/mæm/ in General American and either /mæm/, /mɑːm/, or /məm/ in Received Pronunciation.): for women, a term of general respect or flattery. Originally used only for a woman of rank or authority. May also refer to a female procurer. Equivalent to "Sir" (see above).
  - "Sir", "Madam", and "Ma'am" are commonly used by workers performing a service for the beneficiary of the service, e.g. "May I take your coat, Ma'am?"
  - "Madam" is used with the name of an office to address a woman who is the office-holder, e.g. "Madam President".
- Dame: for women who have been honoured with a British knighthood in their own right or if they are a baronetess. Women (who are not dames) married to knights are commonly referred to as "Lady".
- Lord: for male barons, viscounts, earls, and marquesses, as well as some of their children. In some countries judges, especially those of higher rank, are referred to as lords, ladies or lordship/ladyship. (Style: Lordship or My Lord).
- Lady: for female peers with the rank of baroness, viscountess, countess, and marchioness, or the wives of men who hold the equivalent titles. By courtesy the title is often also used for wives of Knights and Baronets. (Style: Your Ladyship or My Lady). As a plural, it may be used as an honorific for women generally ("ladies" if referring to a group of women, or as part of "ladies and gentlemen" if referring to a mixed group); "madam" (or "madam and gentlemen") is used in the singular.
- Esq: (/ɪˈskwaɪər/) (abbreviation for Esquire) in the United Kingdom, it is used postnominally in written addresses for any adult male if no pre-nominal honorific (Mr, Dr, etc.) is used. In the United States, it is used in the same manner for lawyers irrespective of sex; usage of "esquire" by a person not licensed to practice in a jurisdiction may be used as evidence of unauthorized practice of law in some cases. It may also be punctuated as "esq" or "esq.", following the same practice for other post-nominals.
- Excellency, also Excellence, a title of honor given to certain high officials, as governors, ambassadors, royalty, nobility, and Roman Catholic bishops and archbishops (preceded by his, your, etc.).
- Her/His Honour: used for judges, mayors and magistrates in some countries. (Style: Your Honour)
- The Honourable or The Honorable (abbreviated to The Hon., Hon. or formerly The Hon'ble) is used for certain officials, members of congress, parliament, presidents, and judges (Style: My Lord/Lady or Your Lordship/Your Ladyship, Mr./Madam Ambassador, Your Honor)
- The Right Honourable: used in the United Kingdom (sometimes abbreviated as Rt Hon) for members of the Privy Council (high government officials, senior judges, archbishops, etc.) and, formally, for peers below the rank of Marquess (normally abbreviated to simply "The", e.g. "The Lord Norton" instead of "The Right Honourable Lord Norton").
- The Most Honourable: for marquesses and marchionesses (and, as a group the Most Honourable Order of the Bath and His Majesty's Most Honourable Privy Council).
- The Much Honoured: for Feudal barons, clan chiefs and lairds. It is stated in Debrett's that Manorial Lords i.e. those who hold Lord of the Manor titles, are addressed as The Much Honoured as simply calling them Mr, Mrs or Miss is incorrect.

== Academic and professional titles ==
- Dr: (/ˈdɒktər/) (abbreviation for Doctor) for the holder of a doctoral degree (e.g. PhD, EdD, MD, etc.) in many countries and for medical practitioners, dentists and veterinary surgeons (including as a courtesy title in countries where these professionals do not normally hold doctoral degrees), although in some countries it is normal to address surgeons as "Mr", "Ms", etc. The informal abbreviation "doc" (/dɒk/) is sometimes used. Citizens of the United Kingdom who hold doctoral degrees or are registered medical practitioners may have the title "Doctor" recorded in their British passports.
- Professor: (/prəˈfɛsər/) (informally abbreviated to "prof" (/prɒf/)) for a person who holds the academic rank of professor in a university or other institution. In the United Kingdom, this is a senior academic position and the title is always used in preference to "Dr", while in the United States the title "Dr" is often preferred. Professors may have their title recorded in British passports.
- KC: (abbreviation for King's Counsel) is used postnominally in written addresses for a judge or barrister who has been made a King's Counsel (KC). The equivalent is Queen's Counsel (QC) during the reign of a Queen. KCs may have this title recorded in British passports.
- Cl (Counsel) or SCl (Senior Counsel): In some common-law jurisdictions, barristers are addressed as Counsel or Senior Counsel, as the case may be. For example, Cl Smith or SCl Smith.
- Eur Ing: for engineers registered as European Engineers with the European Federation of National Engineering Associations. European engineers may have this title recorded in British passports.
- Chancellor: for the chancellor of a university.
- Vice-Chancellor: for the vice-chancellor of a university.
  - At the University of Cambridge, "The Right Worshipful the Vice-Chancellor" is used formally.
  - At the University of Oxford, "The Reverend the Vice-Chancellor" is used formally and the salutation is "Dear Mr Vice-Chancellor" rather than "Dear Vice-Chancellor".
- Principal, President, Master, Warden, Dean, Regent, Rector, Provost, Director, or Chief Executive: as appropriate for heads of colleges at the universities of Cambridge, Durham, London and Oxford, heads of the constituent universities of the National University of Ireland, and the head of Trinity College Dublin.
  - For the Ancient Universities of Scotland, a Rector refers to an elected student advocate with administrative powers. This applies to St Andrews, Edinburgh, Glasgow, and Aberdeen, plus Dundee (due to its history as a part of St Andrews).
  - Note titles sometimes double up, e.g. "Vice-Chancellor and Warden" at Durham University or "Provost and President" at University College London.

== Religious titles ==
=== Christianity ===
- His Holiness (abbreviation HH), oral address Your Holiness, or Holy Father – highest ranking clerics, such as the Pope, patriarchs, and catholicoi.
- His All Holiness (abbreviation HAH), oral address Your All Holiness – the Ecumenical Patriarch of Constantinople.
- His Beatitude or The Most Blessed, oral address Your Beatitude – Eastern Orthodox, Oriental Orthodox and Eastern Catholic patriarchs, and the Ukrainian Greek Catholic Major Archbishop of Kyiv-Halych.
- His Excellency (abbreviation HE), salutation Most Reverend Excellency or Your Excellency – Latin patriarchs and Papal nuncios.
- His Most Eminent Highness (abbreviation HMEH), oral address Your Most Eminent Highness – The Prince and Grand Master of Sovereign Military Order of Malta.
- His Eminence (abbreviation HE), oral address Your Eminence – Roman Catholic cardinals and Eastern Orthodox metropolitans, and archbishops who are not the First Hierarch of an autocephalous church.
- Most Reverend Eminence – Roman Catholic cardinals (not used in English-speaking countries).
- The Most Reverend (abbreviation The Most Rev or The Most Revd) Eastern Orthodox metropolitans and archbishops who are not the First Hierarch of an autocephalous church, Roman Catholic archbishops and bishops in Ireland and the United States, the Church of Ireland Bishop of Meath, the Presiding Bishop of the Episcopal Church of the United States of America, and Marthoma Metropolitans
- His Grace, oral address Your Grace – Anglican and Roman Catholic archbishops in Commonwealth countries, and Marthoma Metropolitans
- His Grace or The Right Reverend (abbreviation The Rt Rev or The Rt Revd), oral address Your Grace – Eastern Orthodox bishops.
- His Lordship or The Right Reverend (abbreviation The Rt Rev), oral address My Lord – Anglican and Roman Catholic bishops in Commonwealth countries.
- The Reverend: (abbreviation "The Rev" or "The Revd") used generally for members of the Christian clergy regardless of affiliation, but especially in Catholic and Protestant denominations. Unlike 'Father' (see below) may be applied to both priests and deacons.
  - Except in the United States, "The Reverend" is used either with first name and surname or with a second title and surname, e.g. "The Revd James Smith" or "The Revd Fr Smith", but not "The Revd Smith".
- Fr: (abbreviation for Father) for priests in Catholic and Eastern Christianity, as well as some Anglican or Episcopalian groups. Unlike 'Reverend' (outside of the United States), may be used with either first name, surname or both.
- Pr: (abbreviation for Pastor) used generally for members of the Christian clergy regardless of affiliation, but especially in Protestant denominations. Equivalent to 'Reverend' (see above).
- Br: (abbreviation for Brother) for men generally in some religious organizations, such as the Church of Jesus Christ of Latter-day Saints; in the Catholic church, Anglican churches and Eastern churches, for male members of religious orders or communities, who are not Priests.
- Sr: (abbreviation for Sister) for female members of religious orders in the Catholic church and other churches, and women generally in some religious organizations such as the Church of Jesus Christ of Latter-day Saints. Sometimes informally abbreviated as 'Sis'.
- Elder: Used as a title for members of a ruling church body in a Presbyterian polity. They may be either appointed by a more powerful body like a session or elected by the congregation, but both are ordained for the purpose of governing a church. Elder is also used generally for male missionaries of the Church of Jesus Christ of Latter-day Saints (LDS Church) and for male members of the adult leadership known as the general authorities. Although most all male adults of the LDS church are Elders, the title is reserved for the prior mentioned groups.

=== Judaism ===
- Rabbi: In Judaism, a rabbi /ˈræbaɪ/ is an ordained religious officiant or a teacher of Torah. This title derives from the Hebrew word רַבִּי rabi [ˈʁabi], meaning "My Master" (irregular plural רבנים rabanim [ʁabaˈnim]), which is the way a student would address a master of Torah. The word "master" רב rav [ˈʁav] literally means "great one".
- The Reverend: Was often used for rabbis, cantors, mohalim, and shochetim in English-speaking countries. May sometimes be used for Jewish chaplains who are not ordained rabbis. This usage has widely gone out of usage in the modern era.
- Cantor: Generally used for Jewish clergy trained to perform the sung portions of prayer services. The word "cantor" comes from the French word "chanteur", meaning "singer".
- Chief Rabbi: Generally used for a leading rabbi of a city or country, often known in Hebrew as רב הראשי. Sometimes an honorific title if a community rabbi has an ancestor who served as a chief rabbi of a town, or for a son of a grand rabbi who is heir apparent to the position of grand rabbi and serves a rabbinical role in a Hasidic community. Generally, in such cases, this is known in Hebrew as אב בית דין, meaning "leader of the rabbinical court" (literally "father of the house of law"), and abbreviated אב"ד. May also be titled as גאון אב בית דין or ראש אב בית דין, which would be abbreviated as גאב"ד or ראב"ד. These abbreviations may be rendered in English spelling as Ab"d, Gaava"d, or Raava"d, and will often be called "Rav". Generally the abbreviated title will be followed either by the name of the city or town (including ancestral towns), or the name of the congregation, or when called "Rav" the town or congregation will come before the title. For example, the chief rabbi of the Vien community is known either as "Ab"d Vien" or the "Vienner Rav". In some communities, particularly those from Hungarian and Galician backgrounds, the title is used interchangeably with the title of Grand Rabbi or Admo"r.
- Grand Rabbi: The charismatic leader of a Hasidic court or community. Generally known in Hebrew as אדונינו מורינו ורבינו, literally "our lord, our teacher, our rabbi", and abbreviated as אדמו"ר and rendered in English spelling as Admo"r or Rebbe. Generally the abbreviated title will be followed either by the name of the city or town (including ancestral towns), or the name of the congregation, or when called "Rebbe" the town or congregation will come before the title. For example, the grand rabbis of the Boston Hasidic communities would be known as either "Admo"r miBoston" or "Bostoner Rebbe".
- Rebbetzin: A rabbi's wife, although in some sense a religious leader for the women in her community in some communities.

=== Islam ===
- Imām: for Islamic clergymen, especially the ones who lead prayers and deliver sermons.
- Shaykh: umbrella term used for those qualified in various fields of knowledge of Islam. (Informally, bearing no relation to the religion, and in addition to its religious title, it's occasionally used as an honorary term to refer to a wealthy person or a person with authority or from the dynasty lineage synonymous with the title "Prince").
- Muftī: males qualified in Islamic jurisprudence with ability to pass legal verdicts.
- Hāfiz or Hāfizah: respectively males and females who have memorised the entire Qur'an (literally 'protector').
- Qārī: males who are qualified in the multiple ways of reading the Qur'an (literally 'reciter').
- Mawlānā: used in some cultures for those who have completed Dars un-Nizām to qualify as a scholar (literally 'our leader').
- Hājī (/ˈhædʒiː/): used by Muslims who have completed the hajj pilgrimage.
- Sayyid and Sayyidah: respectively males and females accepted as descendants of the Islamic prophet Muhammad through his grandsons, Hasan ibn Ali and Husayn ibn Ali, sons of Muhammad's daughter Fatimah and his son-in-law Ali (Ali ibn Abi Talib).
- Sharif: used for descendants of Hasan.
- Ayatollah: a high-ranking religious leader among Shia Muslims, especially in Iran. The most learned Ayatollahs may be referred to as 'Grand Ayatollah'.
- Seghatoleslam: is an honorific title within the Twelver Shia clergy. Seghatoleslam designates narrators whose justice and trustworthiness have been explicitly verified.
- Mohyeddin: holds a special position for certain Muslims, assuming a dual identity as both a personal name and an honorific title within the Islamic tradition.

=== Buddhism ===
- Eminent (abbreviation Emi): Buddhist gurus who perfect their mastery of religious practices and philosophy by physical enhancement or ideals which make them renowned.
- His Holiness: Used for leaders such as the Dalai Lama and the Karmapa.
- Rōshi (老師): title meaning "old teacher" or "old master" in Japanese, with different usages in Zen Buddhism by sect and country
- Sensei: in Zen Buddhism is used to refer to ordained teachers, with usage differences across sects
- Venerable (abbreviation Ven): Ordained Buddhist monks and nuns, as well as novices are referred to as Venerable.

== See also ==
- Canadian honorifics
- Chinese honorifics
- Courtesy titles in the United Kingdom
- French honorifics
- German honorifics
- Indian honorifics
- Japanese honorifics
- Style (manner of address)
