= Courtesy title =

Title that does not have legal significance but is rather used by custom or courtesy

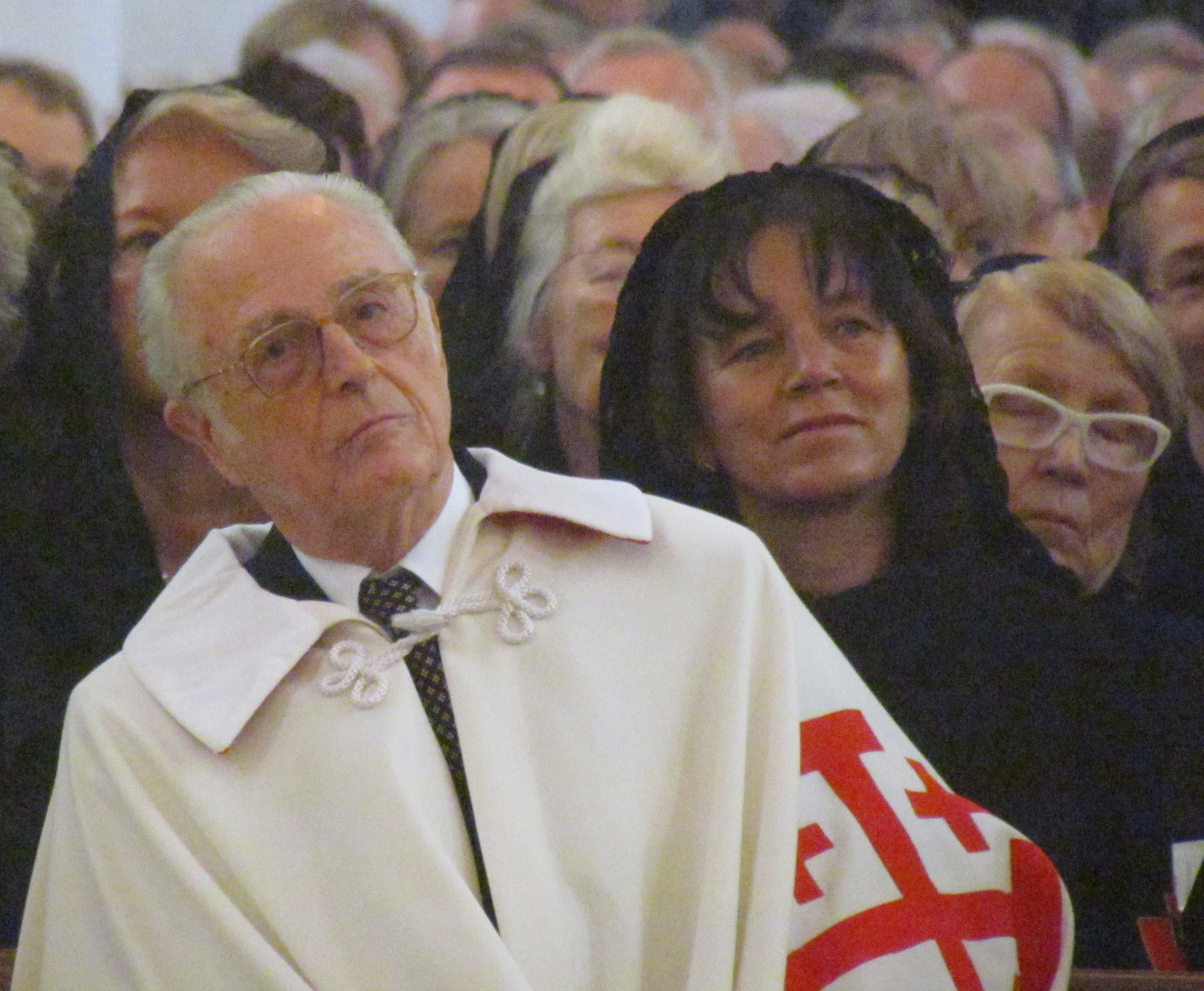
The titles used by Franz von Bayern were abolished by the Weimar Constitution, but he is still commonly known by the courtesy title Duke of Bavaria (Herzog von Bayern).

A courtesy title is a title that does not have legal significance but is rather used by custom or courtesy, particularly, in the context of nobility, the titles used by children of members of the nobility (cf. substantive title).

In some contexts, courtesy title is used to mean the more general concept of a title or honorific such as Mr., Mrs., Ms., Miss, Madam, Sir for those who have not been awarded a knighthood or a baronetcy, as well as Dr. for physicians who have not actually achieved a doctorate.

== Europe ==
In Europe, including France, many titles are not substantive titles but remain titres de courtoisie, and, as such, are adopted unilaterally. When done by a genuine member of the noblesse d'épée the custom was tolerated in French society. A common practice is title declension, when cadet males of noble families, especially landed aristocracy, may assume a lower courtesy title than that legally borne by the head of their family, even though lacking a titled seigneury themselves. For example, the eldest son of the Duke of Paris (substantive title) may be called Marquis de Paris (courtesy title) and younger sons Comte N. of Paris, where N. stands for the first name. In the hereditary Napoleonic and Restoration peerage, declension was a legal right of younger sons, the derivative title being heritable by male primogeniture; King Joseph Napoleon conferred the title "Prince" on his grandchildren in the male and female line.

=== France (Ancien Régime) ===
==== Courtesy title as principal title ====
During the Ancien Régime, the only substantive titles were feudal, land-based and required a royal grant or royal recognition. In order to use the title of count, one had to own a seigneurie elevated to county and to comply with the remainder of the grant. These legal prescriptions, however, came to be consistently enforced only with respect to the title of duke (duc). Most titles were self-assumed courtesy titles, even those used at the royal court and in legal documents.

Clergymen before episcopal ordination used the title of abbé, followed by the name of the principal title of their father. Members of the Sovereign Military Order of Malta used the title of chevalier in the same fashion.

==== Courtesy title used by sons and daughters ====
The heir apparent of a titled nobleman used one of the lesser titles of his father as a courtesy title. In the 17th century, the heirs of the most powerful dukes were sometimes allowed to assume the title of prince. In the 18th century, a trend was for the heir to use the title of duke. It was achieved in one of three ways: if the head of family held two dukedoms, his heir could use the junior one; the head of family could resign his French peerage to his heir, who assumed a new title of duke while the father retained his ducal title; the king could confer a brevet de duc, that is formally accord the non-hereditary style and precedence of a duke to the heir of a ducal title.

The younger sons of a noble titleholder used one of the family's lesser titles, but rarely one of duke or prince. Even in untitled families of the nobility, every son used a different territorial designation, the so-called nom de terre.

The daughters used the title of mademoiselle, followed by the name of a manor owned by their father. For example, Anne Marie Louise d'Orléans, Duchess of Montpensier (known as La Grande Mademoiselle), was the eldest daughter of Gaston d'Orléans (Monsieur) and his first wife Marie de Bourbon, Duchess of Montpensier. Anne Marie Louise was officially known as Mademoiselle from the time of her birth.

=== United Kingdom ===
The United Kingdom has a detailed system of courtesy titles and styles by which the eldest son, male-line grandson or great-grandson and heir of a peer may use a subsidiary title of his ancestor even though it is the ancestor who holds the title substantively. By extension, the children not only of all peers but of those who bear derivative courtesy titles as male-line descendants of a substantive peer bear specific titles (Lord/Lady) or styles (The Honourable) by courtesy. Under United Kingdom law, users of courtesy titles of nobility are held to be commoners, eligible for election to the House of Commons rather than being members of the House of Lords.

== See also ==
- English honorifics
- Royal and noble title styles
