= German honorifics =

Honorifics in the German language and culture

Honorifics are words that connote esteem or respect when used in addressing or referring to a person. In the German language, honorifics distinguish people by age, sex, profession, academic achievement, and rank. In the past, a distinction was also made between married and unmarried women.

The Domestic Protocol Office of the Federal Government of Germany has published a guide Ratgeber für Anschriften und Anreden (Guide to addresses and forms of address) which summarizes how the Federal Government of Germany handles the addressing of persons when conducting government business domestically. While the guide is not binding outside of the government conducting business it is nevertheless a good source when it comes to contemporary polite and formal forms of addressing persons.

== Honorific pronouns ==
Like many languages, German has pronouns for both familiar (used with family members, intimate friends, and children) and polite forms of address. The polite equivalent of "you" is "Sie." Grammatically speaking, this is the 3rd-person-plural form, and, as a subject of a sentence, it always takes the 3rd-person-plural forms of verbs and possessive adjective/ pronouns, even when talking to only one person. (Familiar pronouns have singular and plural forms.) Honorific pronouns are always capitalized except for the polite reflexive pronoun "sich." In letters, e-mails, and other texts in which the reader is directly addressed, familiar pronouns may be capitalized or not. In schoolbooks, the pronouns usually remain lowercased.

Declension of the polite personal pronoun "Sie":

Nominative case: Sie
Accusative case: Sie
Genitive case: Ihrer
Dative case: Ihnen

Declension of polite possessive adjectives:

	Singular			Plural
	Masculine	Feminine	Neuter	All three genders
Nominative case	Ihr	Ihre	Ihr	Ihre
Genitive case	Ihres	Ihrer	Ihres	Ihrer
Dative case	Ihrem	Ihrer	Ihrem	Ihren
Accusative case	Ihren	Ihre	Ihr	Ihre

Obsolete forms of honorific addresses:
Many different honorific pronouns have been used in German over the centuries, most of which have disappeared from the standard language. The polite form Ihr (2nd person plural) emerged in the High Middle Ages. Titles such as “Majesty” are used with a declined form of “Ihr”. In modern times, the third person singular (German: Er (male)/Sie (female)) was added as a further option; this form was even considered more polite than Ihr at times. The Sie developed at the turn of the 17th and 18th centuries, when the original Er/Sie (3rd person singular) was made plural to express an even higher degree of respect. Until the French Revolution, Sie increasingly took the place of Ihr and Er/Sie until it finally became established in almost all social classes in the course of the 19th century.

For more details about German grammar, see the entries about the German language.

== Sex and age ==
Herr (Hr.; pl., Herren)
for men (equivalent to Mr. and Sir in English). Note that this word also includes the meanings "gentleman", "master" and "owner". It is also the form of address for a nobleman or God (English equivalent: Lord). In correspondence, the correct form of address is Sehr geehrter Herr, followed by the surname. When referring to an unknown male person, der Herr ("the gentleman") is sometimes used, although unlike in other languages this is not common. However, a group of several men is often addressed as meine Herren ("gentlemen"). Using "Herr" for very young men, certainly those below the age of 16, is rather awkward and often avoided (except in letters from the state's bureaucracy) by using the first name, or first name and last name.
Historically female persons working in professions like kindergarten teacher or elementary school teacher or
Frau (Fr.; pl., Frauen)
for women (equivalent to Ms., Mrs. and Madam in English). Note that this word also means "woman" and "wife." Unlike the English Mrs., it is never used with a husband's first name. If the last name of the woman is not used or known, the correct form is gnädige Frau ("gracious lady") or its abbreviation gnä' Frau, but this is somewhat old-fashioned except in Austria. In correspondence, the correct form of address is Sehr geehrte Frau, followed by the surname.
Fräulein (Frl.; pl., Fräulein)
for unmarried women (like Miss in English). Fräulein (diminutive of "Frau", literally "lady-ling"). The form of address was removed from official government communication in 1972 in West Germany. It no longer plays a role in contemporary forms of address.
Independent of age, marital status or profession, addressing a female person above the age of maturity as Fräulein is only to be done if the person asks for it - otherwise it can be considered an insult. Also, it can be considered condescending or obsolete to refer to girls below the age of maturity as Fräulein depending on the circumstances. Addressing a girl as Fräulein! or Junge Dame! can sometimes be part of some parent's stern talking. Similar to "Young Lady!" in English.
Dame (pl., Damen)
This is not to be confused with British "Dame", which is a title of nobility (which, in German, Frau originally was but Dame never was). It is used as a direct equivalent of the English word Lady if not intended to mean "daughter of an earl upwards or wife of a peer, baronet or knight"; thus, sich wie eine Dame benehmen to comport oneself like a lady, meine [in letters: sehr geehrte] Damen und Herren "Ladies and gentlemen", and so forth. The euphemistic use is included: Dame vom horizontalen Gewerbe "lady of the night" (literally, "of the horizontal profession"). Also, "Dame" is a technical term for "female dance-partner". Die Dame is also used to address an unknown woman.

There used to be a direct equivalent to Fräulein, viz., Junker (formed “jung Herr”, lit. “young lord”, and equivalent to Master in English), but this word is now only used in describing a specific class (which properly speaking did not consist of "junkers" in this sense at all, but of "Herren") and in the term Fahnenjunker ("officer candidate 3rd class"), reflecting the tradition that only officers are Herren (though now used together with "Herr", see below under military). Also, it never lost the touch of describing exclusively those of higher class, which was originally true of all the four mentioned above but has been lost by all of them.

In the spoken language, the plural form Herrschaften ("ladies and gentlemen") is also used to address a mixed-gender group. This term is also often used when referring to group members in the third person.

In old texts, Herrin („mistress, lady“) is sometimes used to address higher-ranking women. This title no longer plays a role in contemporary forms of address.

Note that almost all other honorifics will be combined with a Herr or Frau respectively (and almost never with a Fräulein); the contrary shall be noted as exceptions in the following.

== Clergy ==
All clergy and ministers are usually called Herr (or Protestants also: Frau) plus the title of their office, e. g., Herr Pfarrer, Frau Pastorin. Adjectival predicates are only used for Roman Catholic clergy, and then in the following order:

- Seine Heiligkeit or Heiliger Vater/der Heilige Vater for the Pope ("His Holiness", "(the) Holy Father")
- Seine Seligkeit for Patriarchs ("His Beatitude"),
- Seine Eminenz for Cardinals,
- Seine Exzellenz for bishops not Cardinals,
- Seine Gnaden for bishops not Cardinals, and for abbots ("His Grace") - now generally considered outdated,
- hochwürdigst for all prelates whosoever (with the usual exception of the Pope) ("the Most Reverend", literally “the High Worthiest”; e. g. der hochwürdigste Herr Generalvikar - "the Right Reverend Father Vicar-General")
- hochwürdig for all priests who are not prelates, and for abbesses ("the Reverend", literally "the High Worthy") - never used for seminarians,
- hochehrwürdig for deacons ("the Reverend", literally "the High Honourable"),
- wohlehrwürdig for subdeacons ("the Reverend", literally "the Well Honourable"),
- ehrwürdig for (ex-)minor clergy below the rank of subdeacon, male religious not clerics, seminarians and female religious not abbesses ("the Reverend", literally "the Honour Worthy").

Whether Monsignors of the first degree (that is, Chaplains of His Holiness) are hochwürdigst or hochwürdig is a borderline case. The predicate hochwürdigst is sometimes also extended to other priests of certain high positions (say, cathedral capitulars), but never for parish priests or for deans.

All these predicates are in increasingly sparing use (except for the first, and except for "Excellency" as applied to the nuncio), but especially Seine Gnaden (which dates from a time when not all bishops were accorded the style "Excellency" then considered higher) and hochehrwürdig and wohlehrwürdig (which tend to be replaced by a simple ehrwürdig), followed by "Excellency" at least as far as auxiliary bishops are concerned. It is good style, though, to use them at least in all places where layfolk would be addressed as sehr geehrte (which they replace), such as at the beginning of letters, speeches and so forth. The oft-seen abbreviation "H. H." (e. g. in obituaries) means "hochwürdigster Herr".

It is incorrect to address an auxiliary bishop as "Herr Weihbischof"; he must be called Herr Bischof. Cardinals are always Herr Kardinal (or more formally Seine/Euer Eminenz), never, for instance, Herr Erzbischof even if they are diocesan archbishops and are addressed as such.

The literal translation of "Monsignor" is Monsignore (using the Italian form), but it is only usually used for Monsignors of the first degree (Chaplains of His Holiness), not for prelates as in English, or for bishops as in Italian. If used, protocol demands to leave away the usual Herr (to avoid the meaning "Lord My Lord"), but this is uncommon in German and the incorrect phrase "Herr Monsignore" can often be heard.

Higher prelates are addressed Herr Prälat (not, usually, "Herr Protonotar"), or possibly with their office (if it is not that of a Cathedral capitular without further distinction, in which case the title of prelate is preferred.)

Abbots are addressed Herr Abt or Vater Abt ("Father Abbot"), abbesses Frau Äbtissin or Mutter Äbtissin ("Mother Abbess"). (The "Father" and "Mother" versions are one of the few cases where Herr or Frau falls away.) Other male religious are called Pater ("Father", but in Latin) if priests and Frater ("Brother", but also in Latin) if not, sometimes together with the surname, sometimes also with the first name (though Canons Regular are called Herr rather than Pater or Frater). Female religious are called Schwester ("Sister", but this time in German). This is not used together with both Herr/Frau and their name, though in the address, it is quite common to address a religious priest who does pastoral work in a parish orally as Herr Pater ("Mr. Father").

(Note generally that the translation of "Father" into German is only used for the Pope and for abbots, and into Latin only for religious clergy.)

- The office of "Priester" (priest) taken simply is nb. never used as a title (there is "Herr Diakon" and "Herr Bischof" but no "Herr Priester"). In the usually brief period where a secular priest has no office that could be used in addressing him, the phrase "Herr Neupriester" ("Mr. New Priest") is used; after retirement, the title Pfarrer (parish priest, pastor) can be kept if held at some point in their life. It is also quite common to address such priests with their academic rank, if they have some ("[hochwürdiger] Herr Dr. Lastname", for a doctor), or their civil-servant rank if they have some ("[hochwürdiger] Herr Oberstudienrat", literally something like "Rev. Mr. Teacher-first-class", for a priest who serves as teacher of religion at a state school). Professors of theology are always addressed by their academic function (except, possibly, if prelates, which usually, though of similar eminence, they aren't).

Parochial vicars usually have the honorific title Kaplan (chaplain), while actual chaplains as a rule have the in this case honorific title Pfarrer ("parish priest").

Jewish rabbis have the title Rabbiner (feminine Rabbinerin).

== Nobility ==
The traditional honorifics for nobility are, in descending order,

- Majestät for emperors and kings and their wives (but not husbands),
- kaiserliche Hoheit for the members of imperial houses (though in the German Empire only the Crown Prince, with the others merely considered Prussian royalty; in Austria after 1867 officially "kaiserlich-königlich")
- königliche Hoheit for members of royal houses and grand-dukes
- Hoheit generally for other sovereign monarchical rulers, though those titled or translated as Fürst in Christian Europe prefer Durchlaucht, and even some of the reigning dukes preferred "herzogliche Durchlaucht",
- Durchlaucht for other dukes and Fürsten (princes, in the sense of head of the house and possibly ruler of a principality); also used for the members of the houses of German dukes (sovereign or not; bearing the titles of Prinz or as well duke) and sometimes of members of the house of Fürsten (if bearing the title "Prinz")
- Erlaucht for the heads of semi-sovereign comital houses (the mediatised Reichsgraf) - rare -,
- Hochgeboren (lit. the High-born) for Grafen (Counts), unless "Erlaucht", and for Freiherren if their house belongs to the Uradel,
- Hochwohlgeboren (lit. the High-well-born) for all other nobility,
- Wohlgeboren - by definition not a style for nobility, but as it were for "semi-nobility", i. e. functionaries of noblemen, bourgeois notables, and so forth.

The last one is now completely obsolete, as is the incorrect practice of elevating bourgeois notables to Hochwohlgeboren (which emerged in the last years of the German monarchies to give expression to the importance of the bourgeoisie in a society that was in its formalities still pre–Industrial Revolution). But also Erlaucht, Hochgeboren, Hochwohlgeboren are increasingly rare (and some make a point of not attaching any such predicate unless to sovereigns of non-German states). Austrian (but not German) nobility is forbidden to attach honorifics to themselves or demand them (but may attach them to family members).

The equivalent of a Baron is called Freiherr (fem. Freifrau, fem. unmarried Freifräulein, which is rare, or its more usual abbreviation Freiin), though some "Barone" exist with foreign (e. g. Russian) titles. Nevertheless, in address they are usually called "Baron", "Baronin", and "Baroness". It is considered incorrect to attach Herr, Frau, Fräulein to "Baron" and so forth, except if the Baron in question is one's actual superior, though this appears often nevertheless. It certainly is incorrect to speak of "Herr Freiherr" and so forth, seeing that this is a doubling, so sometimes the phrase "[sehr geehrter] Freiherr von [e. g.] Sonstwoher" is used (given that Freiherr is unquestionably part of the name of the person in Germany - not in Austria - while calling him "Baron" means treating him as nobility).

It is likewise considered incorrect to attach Herr, Frau, Fräulein to Counts (m. Graf, fem. Gräfin, fem. unmarried Komteß), unless the Count in question is one's actual superior, though again this still appears often

== Academics ==
Professor
While actually not an academic rank, but an office (or a honorific for former holders of this office), all professors are regularly addressed as Professor X or Herr Professor (X) (abbreviated Prof.). Female professors are addressed as Frau Professorin (X) (using feminized version of Professor comparable to the no longer used professoress) or as Frau Professor (X); if the title is used without the Frau, then it should always be rendered as Professorin X. If they hold a doctorate (which is almost always the case), the full title is Prof. Dr. X, possibly enriched by further doctorates they hold, and may be used in this form in the address on letters, in very formal occasions such as the beginning of speeches or introducing a person, and so on. Otherwise, unlike in English it is the title Dr., not the title Prof., that falls away.
PD (i.e., Privatdozent)
A doctor who has achieved a Habilitation and subsequently applied for and been granted venia legendi, but not (yet) given the office or honorary title of professor. Etiquette demands their being called Doktor, with the PD only in use in the said very formal occasions, but sometimes - especially when specific to their academic profession - the reverse practice can be observed.
Doktor
The title Doktor applies to those who hold a doctorate; distinct from the use of Doctor in English, it is not correct to apply it per se to a physician who has completed their studies and received their approbation (though this usage often happens). However, most physicians do write a Doctor's thesis for precisely this reason, earning them the title of Dr. and, when they translate their titles into English, the title of medical doctor - but despite the existence of a thesis not usually the title PhD, given that doctor's theses in medicine are in most cases of significantly lower complexity than theses in other subjects.
Unlike the English-language usage, Doktor may be repeated for double doctorates (Doktor Doktor). It is also combined with other honorifics (Herr Doktor or Frau Doktor Doktor). In oral address, doubling the doctorates only appears in very formal occasions (beginning of speeches, introducing a person etc.) Herr Doktor without the last name is the usual address for a medical doctor, and sometimes regionally for one's attorney (if he holds a doctorate in law); otherwise the last name is usually attached.
Honorary degrees are distinguished as Doktor honoris causa, or "Dr. h.c.". For example, Ferdinand Porsche was the recipient of an honorary Doktoringenieur and would be referred to as "Dr. Ing. h.c. Ferdinand Porsche". The feminized version Doktorin (doctress) is possible, but addressing someone as Frau Doktorin is rare.
Magister
an academic degree somewhat the equivalent of a Master's degree. In Austria this also gives the right to a honorific of the same name (being addressed as "Herr Magister", "Frau Magistra" etc.); in Germany this is quite unusual.
Ingenieur
an Austrian honorific for engineers. (In Germany this is a profession, but not even an academic degree per se, which is more properly Diplomingenieur, Master of Engineering, and the like.)

Doktor and Magistra are the only honorifics (other than those of lower nobility) which can be combined not only with Frau but also with Fräulein (subject to the general caveats concerning the use of Fräulein). However, a practising female physician or attorney would be Frau Doktor if holding a doctorate. A Fräulein Doktor suggests an unmarried woman with a doctorate in an academic (or retired) position. But unless requested by the person, can be considered an insult and plays no part in contemporary forms of address.

In German, the last name can be added after the honorific and academic title, e.g., "Frau Professor Müller".

== Judiciary ==
The otherwise outdated use of calling people with Herr (or Frau) and their functions (when they are not ranks of any kind) is in full vigour as far as courtrooms are concerned, where the participants are addressed as Herr Angeklagter ("Mr. Defendant"), Herr Verteidiger ("Mr. Defending Counsel"), Herr Zeuge ("Mr. Witness"), Herr Kläger ("Mr. Plaintiff") and so forth for the duration of the trial. Judges are Herr Richter, Herr Vorsitzender, Herr Vizepräsident or Herr Präsident (depending on their rank), similarly the public prosecutors (usually Herr Staatsanwalt).

== Military ==
The general address for soldiers is Herr (or nowadays Frau) plus their military rank, e. g., Herr Leutnant. If needed for distinction, the last name can be attached. Subordinates can alternatively be called with rank plus last-name. For soldiers who know each other, for Mannschaften (enlisted personnel not NCOs) among themselves, and also for an officer from the same unit to an enlisted soldier whom he knows personally, the rank can fall away except if the subordinate addresses the superior, but Herr is never attached to the last-name simply.

Superiors can alternatively call their enlisted subordinates by their function (e. g. Richtschütze "gunner", Kraftfahrer "motorist", Truppführer "assistant squad leader", and so forth).

The NVA used Genosse ("Comrade") instead of Herr. In the Imperial Army, the style of "Excellency" was appropriate for some high-ranking generals.

A direct equivalent to the frequent anglophone use of "Sir" does not exist.

== Civil service (incl. teachers) ==
Civil servants (Beamten) used to be called with Herr or Frau plus their rank (for their respective ranks, see the tables at Beamter). This is in full vigour for police-officers (with the now unused rank Wachtmeister or Polizist or Polizistin stepping in if the precise rank is not known and the addresser is not familiar with the shoulder strap), but otherwise somewhat outdated.

As teachers on public schools are, as a rule, civil servants (and on Church schools often receive a similar status), this is likewise true for teachers, with the exception that for teachers not the headmaster, it is perhaps even a bit more outdated to use their rank than for other civil servants. In earlier times, teachers were addressed almost exclusively by their title (e.g. Herr Professor, Herr Studienrat). The corresponding form of address for head teachers was Herr Rektor or Herr Direktor. Nowadays, Herr/Frau and the surname are generally used, although the phrase Herr Lehrer (“Sir”) can still be found.

== Professions ==
It used to be the case that the name of professions was used as a honorific, together with Herr (or Frau), e. g. Herr Schriftsteller ("Mr. Professional Writer"), Herr Installateur ("Mr. Plumber") and so forth. This is generally outdated.

Though there is a professional qualification called Meister ("master craftsman"), and there is also an outdated honorific called Meister (in this case roughly equivalent to "goodman"; in use, when "Herr" was only applied to high-ranking persons, for the non-dependent men below them), this was never a honorific specifically in use for master craftsmen.

== Professional honorifics ==
In Austria – and in monarchical times also in Germany – the Head of State can give certain titles to people of notable achievements in their profession (and, if not for civil servants, usually considerable donations to public welfare). These, again, are usually used with Herr and Frau respectively.

A well-known example is the Kommerzialrat (Prussia: Kommerzienrat) ("Commercial Counsellor [implied: to the Court]), which denotes an entitled businessman. In the monarchies, there also was an "augmented" form of that, in this case Geheimer Kommerzialrat, generally received by adding the adjective "Geheim" (see Geheimrat). This literally means "Privy (Commercial, etc.) Councillor" and is roughly the equivalent of a person knighted for their (in this case commercial) achievements.

Germany generally has not kept the practice, except for the fine arts (Kammersänger, Staatsschauspieler and so forth). People who had received a title under the monarchies usually retained them until their death.

On the other hand, the distinction Hoflieferant ("Court supplier") was not strictly speaking a honorific (though often used as such), but implied the actual function of someone supplying a Court in at least a marginal role with some (high-quality) goods. Hoflieferant is now still attached to the companies who had received it under the monarchies, but no longer as previously to their proprietors in person (if they, as now always the case, came into that position later, whether by inheriting or buying).
