= General surgery =

Medical specialty

General surgeon
Occupation
- Names: Physician; Surgeon
- Occupation type: Specialty
- Activity sectors: Medicine, Surgery

Description
- Education required: Master of Surgery (M.S.); Doctor of Medicine (M.D.); Doctor of Osteopathic medicine (D.O.); Bachelor of Medicine, Bachelor of Surgery (M.B.B.S.); Bachelor of Medicine, Bachelor of Surgery (MBChB)
- Fields of employment: Hospitals, Clinics

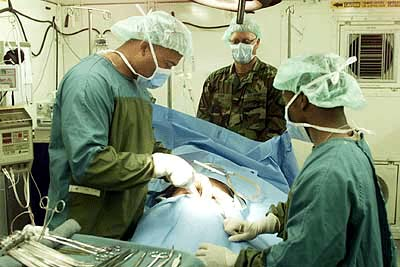
A surgeon operating.

General surgery is a surgical specialty that focuses on alimentary canal and abdominal contents including the esophagus, stomach, small intestine, large intestine, liver, pancreas, gallbladder, appendix and bile ducts, and often the thyroid gland. General surgeons also deal with diseases involving the skin, breast, soft tissue, trauma, peripheral artery disease and hernias and perform endoscopic as such as gastroscopy, colonoscopy and laparoscopic procedures.

== Scope ==
General surgeons may sub-specialise into one or more of the following disciplines:

=== Trauma surgery ===
In many parts of the world including North America, Australia and the United Kingdom, the overall responsibility for trauma care falls under the auspices of general surgery. Some general surgeons obtain advanced training in this field (most commonly surgical critical care) and specialty certification surgical critical care. General surgeons must be able to deal initially with almost any surgical emergency. Often, they are the first port of call to critically ill or gravely injured patients, and must perform a variety of procedures to stabilize such patients, such as thoracostomy, cricothyroidotomy, compartment fasciotomies and emergency laparotomy or thoracotomy to stanch bleeding. They are also called upon to staff surgical intensive care units or trauma intensive care units.

All general surgeons are trained in emergency surgery. Bleeding, infections, bowel obstructions and organ perforations are the main problems they deal with. Cholecystectomy, the surgical removal of the gallbladder, is one of the most common surgical procedures done worldwide. This is most often done electively, but the gallbladder can become acutely inflamed and require an emergency operation. Infections and rupture of the appendix and small bowel obstructions are other common emergencies.

=== Laparoscopic surgery ===
This is a relatively new specialty dealing with minimal access techniques using cameras and small instruments inserted through 3- to 15-mm incisions. Robotic surgery is now evolving from this concept (see below). Gallbladders, appendices, and colons can all be removed with this technique. Hernias are also able to be repaired laparoscopically. Bariatric surgery can be performed laparoscopically and there are benefits of doing so to reduce wound complications in obese patients. General surgeons that are trained today are expected to be proficient in laparoscopic procedures.

=== Colorectal surgery ===
General surgeons treat a wide variety of major and minor colon and rectal diseases including inflammatory bowel diseases (such as ulcerative colitis or Crohn's disease), diverticulitis, colon and rectal cancer, gastrointestinal bleeding and hemorrhoids.

=== Upper gastrointestinal surgery ===
General surgeons can specialise in Upper Gastro-intestinal (or foregut) surgery, which includes the surgical treatment of diseases of the stomach and oesophagus, liver, pancreas and gallbladder. In the UK, Upper GI surgeons can subspecialise further as benign surgeons, dealing with hiatus hernias and gallbladder diseases, bariatric surgeons, providing surgical care for weight management and metabolic diseases, or oesophago-gastric surgeons, dealing with complex problems related to the upper gastrointestinal tract (the foregut), including cancer. Surgical care of complex liver and pancreatic problems (including liver cancer and pancreatic cancer) is undertaken by Hepatobiliary and Pancreatic Surgery sub-specialists.

=== Breast surgery ===
General surgeons perform a majority of all non-cosmetic breast surgery from lumpectomy to mastectomy, especially pertaining to the evaluation, diagnosis and treatment of breast cancer.

=== Vascular surgery ===
General surgeons can perform vascular surgery if they receive special training and certification in vascular surgery. Otherwise, these procedures are typically performed by vascular surgery specialists. However, general surgeons are capable of treating minor vascular disorders.

=== Endocrine surgery ===
General surgeons are trained to remove all or part of the thyroid and parathyroid glands in the neck and the adrenal glands just above each kidney in the abdomen. In many communities, they are the only surgeon trained to do this. In communities that have a number of subspecialists, other subspecialty surgeons may assume responsibility for these procedures.

=== Transplant surgery ===
Responsible for all aspects of pre-operative, operative, and post-operative care of abdominal organ transplant patients. Transplanted organs include liver, kidney, pancreas, and more rarely small bowel.

=== Surgical oncology ===
Surgical oncologist refers to a general surgical oncologist (a specialty of a general surgeon), but thoracic surgical oncologists, gynecologist and so forth can all be considered surgeons who specialize in treating cancer patients. The importance of training surgeons who sub-specialize in cancer surgery lies in evidence, supported by a number of clinical trials, that outcomes in surgical cancer care are positively associated to surgeon volume (i.e., the more cancer cases a surgeon treats, the more proficient they become, and their patients experience improved survival rates as a result). This is another controversial point, but it is generally accepted, even as common sense, that a surgeon who performs a given operation more often, will achieve superior results when compared with a surgeon who rarely performs the same procedure. This is particularly true of complex cancer resections such as pancreaticoduodenectomy for pancreatic cancer, and gastrectomy with extended (D2) lymphadenectomy for gastric cancer. Surgical oncology is generally a 2-year fellowship following completion of a general surgery residency (5–7 years).

=== Cardiothoracic surgery ===
Most cardiothoracic surgeons in the U.S. (D.O. or M.D.) first complete a general surgery residency (typically 5–7 years), followed by a cardiothoracic surgery fellowship (typically 2–3 years). However, new programmes are currently offering cardiothoracic surgery as a residency (6–8 years).

=== Pediatric surgery ===
Pediatric surgery is a subspecialty of general surgery. Pediatric surgeons do surgery on patients under age 18. Pediatric surgery is 5–7 years of residency and a 2–3 year fellowship.

== Trends ==
In the 2000s, minimally invasive surgery became more prevalent. Considerable enthusiasm has been built around robot-assisted surgery (also known as robotic surgery), despite a lack of data suggesting it has significant benefits that justify its cost.

== Training ==
In Canada, Australia, New Zealand, and the United States general surgery is a five to seven year residency and follows completion of medical school, either MD, MBBS, MBChB, or DO degrees. In Australia and New Zealand, a residency leads to eligibility for Fellowship of the Royal Australasian College of Surgeons. In Canada, residency leads to eligibility for certification by and Fellowship of the Royal College of Physicians and Surgeons of Canada, while in the United States, completion of a residency in general surgery leads to eligibility for board certification by the American Board of Surgery or the American Osteopathic Board of Surgery which is also required upon completion of training for a general surgeon to have operating privileges at most hospitals in the United States.

In the United Kingdom, surgical trainees may apply to enter training after five years of medical school and two years of the Foundation Programme. During the two year core surgical training programme ("phase 1"), doctors are required to sit the Membership of the Royal College of Surgeons (MRCS) examination. On award of the MRCS by one of the four surgical colleges, surgeons may hold the title 'Mister' or 'Miss/Ms./Mrs' rather than doctor. This tradition dates back hundreds of years in the United Kingdom from when only physicians attended medical school and surgeons did not, but were rather associated with barbers in the Barber Surgeon's Guild. The tradition is also present in many Commonwealth countries including New Zealand and some states of Australia. After completion of phase 1 training, trainees may apply for a nationally awarded Higher Surgical Training (HST) programme, which lasts six years and is now divided into two further phases (phases 2 and 3). Trainees are expected to declare a sub-specialty before the end of phase 2, and training during phase 3 focuses on that sub-specialty. Before the end of HST, the examination for Fellowship of the Royal College of Surgeons (FRCS) must be taken in general surgery plus the subspeciality. Upon completion of training, the surgeon will be eligible for entry on the GMC Specialist Register. They may then apply to work both in the NHS and independent sector as a consultant surgeon, although many trainees complete further fellowships. The implementation of the European Working Time Directive limited UK surgical residents to an average 48-hour working week.

In India general surgery is a 3 year postgraduate medical degree referred as MS (General Surgery) and often is the foundation course for further super-specialisation such as Neurosurgery, Cardiothoracic surgery, plastic surgery, etc. In India qualified physicians may apply for the course after successful completion of MBBS from a NMC recognised institution, one year of mandatory internship and rural service bond (if any). The candidates applying for general surgery must clear for NEET (PG) or AIIMS INI-CET (for admission in institutions of national importance) and are granted admission on the basis of merit and reservation.

== See also ==
- Abdominal surgery
- Physician
- Reconstructive surgery
- Surgeon
- Surgery
- Traumatology
