= Lady =

Title of address for a noble woman

A lady is a woman who behaves in a polite way. Once used to describe only women of a high social class or status, the female counterpart of lord, now it may refer to any adult woman, as gentleman can be used for men.

"Lady" is also a formal title in the United Kingdom. "Lady" is used before the family name or peerage of a woman with a title of nobility or honorary title suo jure (in her own right), such as female members of the Order of the Garter and Order of the Thistle, or the wife of a lord, a baronet, Scottish baron, laird, or a knight, and also before the first name of the daughter of a duke, marquess, or earl.

== Etymology ==
The word comes from Old English hlǣfdige; the first part of the word is a mutated form of hlāf, "loaf, bread", also seen in the corresponding hlāford, "lord". The second part is usually taken to be from the root dig-, "to knead", seen also in dough; the sense development from bread-kneader, or bread-maker, or bread-shaper, to the ordinary meaning, though not clearly to be traced historically, may be illustrated by that of "lord".

== Usage ==
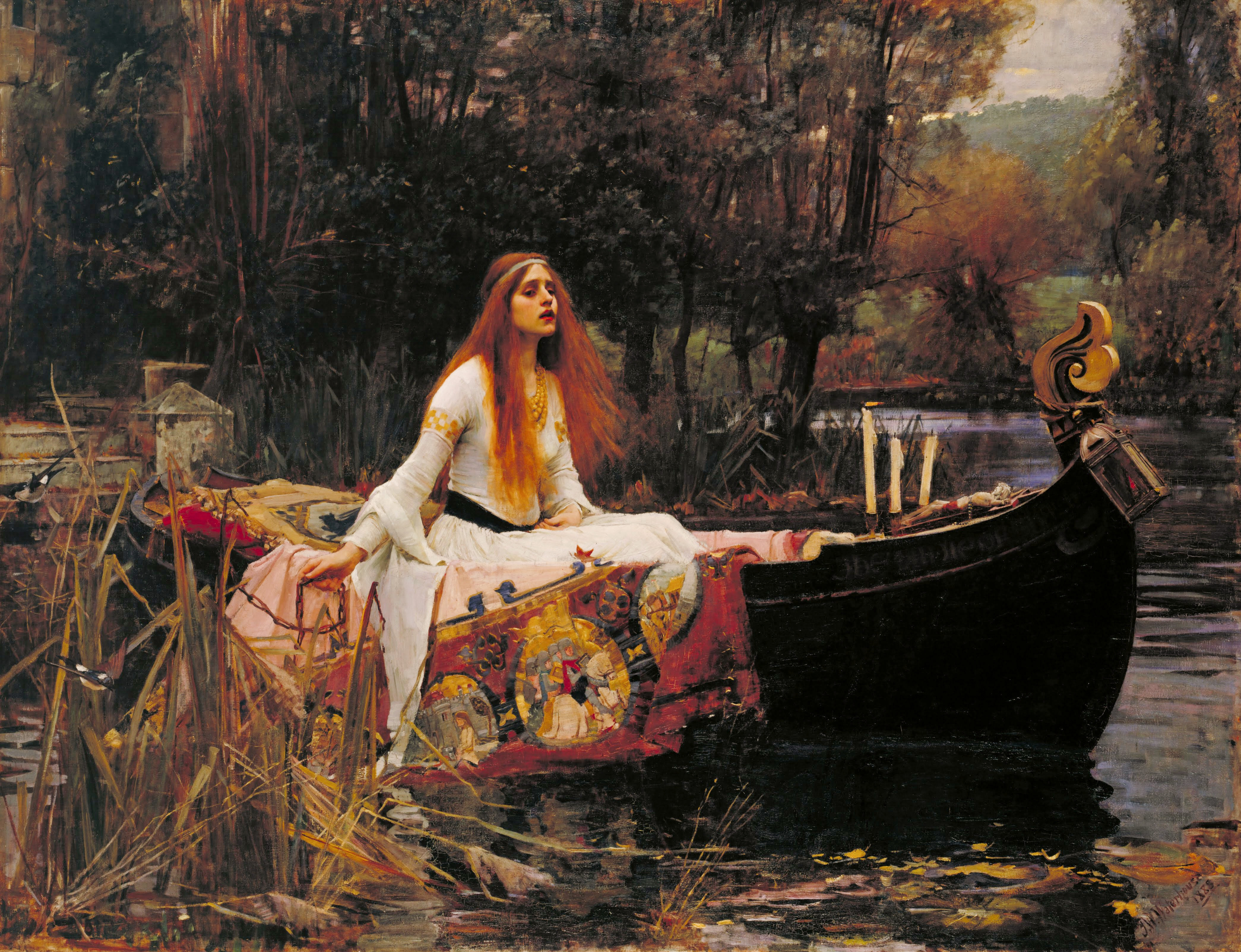
John William Waterhouse's The Lady of Shalott, 1888 (Tate Gallery, London, England)

The primary meaning of "mistress of a household" is now mostly obsolete, save for the term "landlady" and in set phrases such as "the lady of the house". This meaning is retained in the southern states of the United States. In some contexts "lady" is synonymous with the old-fashioned word "gentlewoman", meaning someone of high social status by birth and upbringing, but not necessarily titled. The term is also used in titles such as first lady and lady mayoress, the wives of elected or appointed officials.

In many European languages the equivalent term serves as a general form of address equivalent to the English Mrs (French Madame, Spanish Señora, Italian Signora, German Frau, Polish Pani, etc.). In those languages it is correct to address a woman whose name is unknown as Madame, Señora, etc., but in polite English usage "lady" has for centuries only normally been a term of address in the plural, which is also the case for "gentleman". Use as a singular noun of address was once common but has become mostly confined to poetry. In some dialects it may still be used to address an unknown woman in a brusque manner, often in an imperative or interrogatory context, analogous to "mister" for an unknown male: e.g., "Hey, lady, you aren't allowed in here!" In this usage, the word "lady" is very seldom capitalized when written. The usual English term for politely addressing a woman is madam or its abbreviation ma'am.

In English, relatively few job titles are un-gendered. Some names for jobs are gender-neutral, e.g. mail carrier (postal worker), but where there is a common word with a -man suffix, sometimes -lady may be used as an equivalent, e.g. postman and (sometimes) postlady. Using "lady" in professional job titles which had previously been male preserves fell out of favour with second-wave feminism (lady doctor, lady engineer, lady judge), though lady doctor is sometimes used by a healthcare receptionist when booking an appointment at a group practice health centre so that the situation is clear to the patient. It is still used in some other occupations, to give dignity and express respect to less skilled work such as tea ladies in offices and hospitals, lunch ladies (or dinner ladies) in school canteens, cleaning ladies in private homes and in business premises, and healthcare ladies for female healthcare assistants.

Both British and American commentators noted the shifting uses of "lady" in the mid-twentieth century. The American journalist William Allen White noted one of the difficulties in his 1946 autobiography. He relates that a woman who had paid a fine for prostitution came to his newspaper to protest, not against the fact that her conviction had been reported, but that the newspaper had referred to her as a "woman" rather than a "lady". After the incident, White assured his readers, his papers referred to human females as "women", with the exception of police court characters, who were all "ladies". The British historian Nancy Mitford wrote an influential essay in 1954, "U vs. non-U", in which she noted the class distinctions: lower class women strongly preferred to be called "ladies", while those from higher social backgrounds were content to be identified as "women". Commenting on the word in 1953, C. S. Lewis wrote that "the guard at Holloway said it was a ladies' prison!" The term "a bag lady" (vagabond) is a euphemism for a woman who has fallen on hard times; a "lady of the night" is a polite term for a prostitute.

In British English, "lady" is often, but not always, simply a courteous synonym for "woman". Public toilets are often distinguished by signs showing simply "Ladies" or "Gentlemen". "Lady" can have a formal and respectful quality, being used to describe an elderly woman as "an old lady" or when speaking about a woman to a child (e.g. "Give the money to the lady.") It remains in use as a counterpart to "gentleman", in the plural phrase "ladies and gentlemen", and is generally interchangeable (in a strictly informal sense) with "woman" (as in, "The lady at the store said I could return this item within thirty days"). However, some women, since the rise of second-wave feminism, have objected to the term used in contexts such as the last example, arguing that the term sounds patronising and outdated when used in this way; a man in the same context would not necessarily be referred to as a "gentleman". One feminist proponent of language reform, Robin Lakoff, in her book Language and Woman's Place (1975), notably raised the issue of the ways in which "lady" is not used as the counterpart of "gentleman". It is suggested by academic Elizabeth Reid Boyd that feminist usage of the word "lady" has been reclaimed in the 21st century.

=== British titles ===
Formally, "Lady" is the female counterpart to higher ranks in society, from gentlemen, through knights, to peers of the realm. During the Middle Ages, princesses or daughters of the blood royal were usually known by their first names with "Lady" prefixed, e.g. The Lady Elizabeth; since Old English and Middle English did not have a female equivalent to princes or earls or other royals or nobles. Aside from the queen, women of royal and noble status simply carried the title of "Lady".

As a title of nobility, the uses of "lady" in Britain are parallel to those of "lord". It is thus a less formal alternative to the full title giving the specific rank, of marchioness, countess, viscountess or baroness, whether as the title of the husband's rank by right or courtesy, or as the lady's title in her own right. A peeress's title is used with the definite article: Lord Morris's wife is "the Lady Morris". A widow's title derived from her husband becomes the dowager, e.g. The Dowager Lady Smith. In the case of an heir apparent to a peerage using one of his father's subsidiary titles by courtesy, his wife uses his courtesy title in the same way as the wife of a substantive peer, except that the definite article is not used.

The title "Lady" is also used for a woman who is the wife of a Scottish baron or laird, the title "Lady" preceding the name of the barony or lairdship. In the case of younger sons of a duke or marquess, who have the courtesy title "Lord" prefixed to their given and family name, the wife may use "Lady" prefixed to the husband's given and family names, e.g. Lady John Smith. However, she may not use "Lady" prefixed to her husband's surname alone. Neither may she use the title prefixed to her own given name unless entitled to do so by her own birth as the daughter of an earl, marquess or duke.

The daughters of dukes, marquesses and earls are by courtesy "ladies"; here, that title is prefixed to the given and family name of the lady, e.g. Lady Jane Smith, and this is preserved if the lady marries a commoner, e.g. Mr John and Lady Jane Smith. "Lady" is also the customary title of the wife of a baronet or knight, but in this case without Christian name: "Lady" with the surname of the husband only, Sir John and Lady Smith. When a woman divorces a knight and he marries again, the new wife will be Lady Smith while the ex-wife becomes Jane, Lady Smith until either her own death or until she remarries. Widows and former wives of knights retain their married style until their death or they remarry. She is also never addressed as "Lady Jane Smith".

Female members of the Order of the Garter and Order of the Thistle who do not hold a higher style also receive the prefix of "Lady"; here that title is prefixed to the given and family name of the lady, e.g. Lady Marion Fraser, LT, with the post nominal LG or LT, respectively, and this is preserved if the lady marries.

== Other meanings ==
The special use of the word as a title of the Virgin Mary, usually Our Lady, represents the Latin Domina Nostra. In Lady Day and Lady Chapel, the word is properly a genitive, representing hlǣfdigan "of the Lady".

The word is also used as a title of the Wiccan Goddess, The Lady.

Margaret Thatcher was informally referred to in the same way by many of her political colleagues when Prime Minister of the United Kingdom. Her husband was later created a baronet, thus making her "Lady Thatcher" as of right. After she retired, she was given a peerage as Baroness Thatcher, of Kesteven in the County of Lincolnshire, and was thereafter known as "The Lady Thatcher".

Elsewhere in the Commonwealth, the word is used in a similar fashion to aristocratic usage in Britain. In Ghana, for example, the consort of the Asantehene of the Ashanti people is known as Lady Julia Osei Tutu. In Nigeria, the Yoruba aristocrats Kofoworola, Lady Ademola and Oyinkansola, Lady Abayomi made use of the title due to their being the wives of British knights.

== See also ==
- Girl
- Dame, a title parallel to Sir

== Sources ==
- Merriam Webster's Dictionary of English Usage (Merriam-Webster, 1989), ISBN 0-87779-132-5.
- Lakoff, Robin. Language and Woman's Place (New York, Harper & Row, 1975). ISBN 0-19-516757-0.
