= Dysphemism =

Expression with derogatory connotations

A dysphemism is an expression with connotations that are derogatory either about the subject matter or to the audience. Dysphemisms contrast with neutral or euphemistic expressions. For example, expressing disapproval by calling a person a snake is a dysphemism. Dysphemism may be motivated by fear, distaste, hatred, contempt, humour and abuse.

== Etymology ==
The word dysphemism was composed from the Greek elements dys δύς 'mis-' and pheme φήμη 'speech, voice, reputation' in the late 19th century. Related terms include malphemism (from the Latin malus 'bad'), cacophemism (from the Greek kakos κακός 'bad') and pyrophemism (from the Greek pyr πῦρ 'fire')

== Usage ==
A dysphemism is a marked form (standing out as unusual or divergent) which expresses a speaker's view or attitude towards the listener or group.

== Types ==
=== Dysphemistic epithets ===
Animal names are frequently used as dysphemistic epithets. By using one, the speaker attempts to offend or antagonize the listener by targeting their humanity. Examples include bitch, pig, swine, chicken, weasel, sheep, snake, rat, and jackass.

=== Name dysphemism ===
Used when someone uses another's given name, disrespectfully or otherwise inappropriately, rather than a kinship term, style of office, (Note: Examples include "His Honour the Judge," "Her Imperial Majesty," and "His Holiness".) or honorific to address someone specifically." (Note: Examples include "Mr.," "Mrs.," "Dr." and "Your Excellency".) The speaker uses a more casual or lower style than is appropriate given the social context. One example is calling one's mother by her first name rather than Mom.

- "Peter, what are you doing?" (rather than Dad/Father)
- "How are you doing, Bill?" (rather than Uncle Bill)

Many languages, to a greater extent than in English, indicate respect with verb tenses and thus provide more scope for such dysphemism and require care by non-native speakers to avoid causing offence by unintentional dysphemism.

This use of language may not constitute dysphemism if the choice of words used by the speaker is welcomed by the listener, such as a father who prefers being called by his given name as opposed to Dad/Father. In that case it would appeal to the listener's positive face rather than damage it and would thus not be a dysphemism.

Similarly, being more formal with someone than expected may be a type of dysphemism. For example, if a child usually calls their father dad or papa, calling him father may be a way of offending or antagonizing him, through coldness or distance (in other words, one might formally refer to one's father as father, but when speaking to him one would use a particularly endearing term), or that he is merely his role, if a child usually called Billy is addressed by a parent as William.

Dysphemism may also be indicated by the disuse or substitution of someone's name or title. For instance, someone named Teresa who made overstated claims for a company-paid trip could be described as "the little witch who charmed the boss into approving that phony expense report".

Anger or dissatisfaction with the listener (or group of people) may compel a speaker to use a name dysphemism or term of address dysphemism.

=== Cross-cultural dysphemism ===
Various slang terms that are dysphemistic in one culture may not be if they hold a different meaning in another culture. For instance, the word fag when used in American English is typically a slur against gay men. However, in British English, the word fag can be an inoffensive term used to refer to a cigarette, or, previously, a junior boy who serves a senior boy in a British public school. Likewise, the word fanny when used in American English is a euphemism for one's buttocks, so benign that children use it. However, in British, Australian, New Zealand, and South African English, the word fanny is slang for vulva and is considered to be vulgar.

== Context and drift ==
Some phrases that are euphemisms in certain contexts can be considered dysphemistic in others. These are often referred to as X-phemisms: whether the utterance is dysphemistic or not depends on the context of the utterance. For example, many X-phemisms regarding sexual intercourse could be considered euphemistic within peer groups yet dysphemistic in certain audiences. One might be more likely to say that one "got laid" to a friend than to one's grandparents.

There may also be instances in which conflicting definitions of the same word may lead to unintentional dysphemism. The pejorative use of the word terrorist is a salient example, as definitions of the word terrorist may vary across cultures and even among individuals in the same culture. Typically, the word "terrorist" refers to one who uses violence and fear as a means to pursue political, religious or ideological aims. This definition is ambiguous, and many groups that refer to themselves as "freedom fighters", "revolutionaries", "rebels" or "liberators" are referred to as "terrorists" by dissenting parties. Labeling groups as terrorist draws associations with other groups labeled as such even when no direct connection might be present. In 2003, the Philippine government's intention to label the Moro Islamic Liberation Front as a terrorist organization was indicated by the organization to be an escalation of hostilities. It was their belief that by calling their organization a terrorist organization they were being directly compared to Al-Qaeda, with whom they claim no connection. Naming groups in this way has been described, "A name will place emphasis on certain aspects and characteristics of an object, while neglecting or omitting other key areas".

The interpretation and the production of a text (whether it be written, verbal, or multi-modal) depends on the previous knowledge and experience of the interpreter or producer. The individual compares matching features with representations stored in their long-term memory. Certain lexical items can be used to activate these representations, conjuring stereotypical images which then become the prototype in the listener's mind. Dysphemic terms activate negative stereotypes present in the listener's memory and affect their interpretation of the given text.

=== Move from euphemism to dysphemism ===
The process of pejoration leads to words that were once considered euphemisms to now be considered dysphemisms. In American culture, words like colored were once considered euphemisms, but have since been replaced by terms like Black and African American. Sometimes slight modifications of dysphemisms can make them acceptable: while colored people is considered dysphemistic, people of color does not carry the same connotations. The words idiot and moron were once polite terms to refer to people with mental disabilities, but they are now rarely used without dysphemism. Likewise, the word retarded was introduced as a new polite form once the previous terms became dysphemistic; since then, retarded has itself become dysphemistic. Often a word with both euphemistic and dysphemistic uses becomes restricted to the dysphemistic use alone. The term euphemism treadmill, coined by Steven Pinker, describes this process, in which terms with an emotionally charged referent that were once euphemisms become dysphemistic by association with the referent.

=== Reclamation of dysphemisms ===
Nigger would typically be dysphemistic; however, if used between African Americans it may be seen as neutral (although extremely casual) by the listener, depending on their social distance from the speaker and perceived status relative to the other party; see nigga.

Reclamations of dysphemistic terms have been both successful and unsuccessful. The term chicano was a derogatory term and has been successfully reclaimed. Some terms like Yankee (for an American) or punk (for a late 1970s rocker), began as derogatory but were not considered such and adopted proudly by the named group. There have also been movements to reclaim words for gay, lesbian, bisexual, and otherwise non-heterosexual people, such as queer, fag and dyke.

Other historic examples of dysphemism reclamation include the term Impressionism, which originated as a critical remark that "Monet's Impression, Sunrise was not art, it was an impression", but was adopted to be the formal name of the style and was accepted by the artists themselves.

== Taboo terms ==
Taboo terms are used as insults, epithets, and expletives because they damage the listener's face, which might destroy social harmony—especially if the speaker and listener are socially distant from each other. For this reason, terms of insult are socially taboo and dysphemistic. Breaking a social taboo can act as an emotional release, with the illocutionary act of expressing a feeling or attitude.

Bad or taboo words for many things far outnumber the "good" words. Hugh Rawson notices in his book Wicked Words that when looking at Roget's International Thesaurus, there are "89 synonyms for drunk, compared to 16 for sober, and 206 for bad person compared to 82 for good person. The synonyms for unchastity in the Thesaurus fill 140 lines, occupying exactly four times as much space as those for chastity. For unchaste woman, 34 synonyms are listed; for unchaste man, 24. No synonyms at all are given for chaste woman and chaste man."

References to bodily excretions are often used in dysphemisms. Many communities historically believed that bodily effluvia such as feces, spittle, blood, nail-parings, and hair-clippings were cursed. Such revulsion is apparently learned: children and animals are not put off by bodily effluvia (unless they have a foul smell). In a study done at Monash and La Trobe Universities in Melbourne, Australia, subjects rated bodily effluvia according to how revolting they found them. Feces, vomit, semen and menstrual blood were rated as most revolting while nail parings, breath, blood from a wound, hair clippings, and breast milk were rated as least revolting. This continuum of the level of revulsion is apparent in certain dysphemisms such as shitter for 'toilet', to come for 'to ejaculate', and puke hole for 'tavern' or 'toilet'.

== See also ==
- Hyperbole
- Impoliteness
- Kenning
- Loaded language
- Metaphor
- Pejorative
- Satiric misspelling

== Sources ==
- Allan, Keith., Burridge, Kate. Euphemism and Dysphemism: Language Used As Shield and Weapon. United States: Replica Books, 2000.
- Brown, E. K.. The Encyclopedia of Language and Linguistics: Spe-Top. Netherlands: Elsevier, 2006.
- Allan, Keith., Burridge, Kate. Forbidden Words: Taboo and the Censoring of Language. N.p.: Cambridge University Press, 2006.
