= French honorifics =

Titles in the French language

French honorifics are based on the wide use of Madame for women and Monsieur for men.

== Social ==
- Monsieur (abbreviated M.; plural messieurs, MM.) for a man.
- Madame (Mme; plural mesdames, Mmes) for a woman.
- Mademoiselle (Mlle; plural mesdemoiselles, Mlles) is a traditional alternative for an unmarried woman.

Usage of mademoiselle varies based on regions and ideology. In Canada and Switzerland, public administrations have been banned from using this title for a long time. France has taken this step in 2012. In Belgium, its use is not recommended, but not forbidden either.

In France, calling a young woman mademoiselle is usually considered more polite, and calling a middle-aged woman mademoiselle can be a way to tell her that she looks like she is in her twenties and may therefore be considered flattering.

== Professional ==
- Docteur (Dr) is used for medical practitioners, while professeur is used for professors and teachers. The holders of a doctorate other than medical are generally not referred to as docteur, though they have the legal right to use the title; professors in academia use the style monsieur le professeur rather than the honorific plain professeur.
- Maître (Me) is used for law professions such as solicitors and notaries.
- Judges are called Monsieur le Président or Madame la Présidente (Madame le Président is sometimes preferred in France) if they preside over a court of justice, or Monsieur le Juge and Madame la Juge (Madame le Juge is sometimes preferred in France and in Canada) otherwise.

Any other honorific is usually created by using monsieur or madame and then adding a title. For instance, Monsieur le Président or Monsieur le Ministre.

== Religious ==
Catholic clergy use several specific honorifics.

- Son Eminence, Monsieur le Cardinal: Cardinals.
- Son Excellence, Monseigneur: Bishops, archbishops.
- Monsieur l'abbé, Mon Père: priests.
- Dom, Mon Père/Frère: Benedictine monks.
- Le Révérend Père, Mon Père: abbots and some other regular clergy.
- Frère, Mon Frère: regular clergy unless style with Père (the usage changes a lot according to orders and congregations).
- La Révérende Mère, Ma Mère: abbesses.
- Sœur, Ma Sœur: nuns.

The clergy of other faiths use the honorifics Monsieur le ... or Madame la ..., such as Monsieur le rabbin or Monsieur l'imam.

== Nobility and royalty ==
Kings of France used the honorific sire; princes monseigneur; and queens and princesses were plain madame.

Nobles of the rank of duke used Monsieur le duc or Madame la duchesse, non-royal princes used Prince or Princesse (without the monsieur or madame), other noblemen monsieur and madame. Only servants ever addressed their employer as Monsieur le comte (count) or Madame la baronne (baroness).

== See also ==
- German honorifics
- Chinese honorifics
- Korean honorifics
- Japanese honorifics
