= Mademoiselle (title) =

French manner of address

Mademoiselle (pronounced [madmwazɛl]) or demoiselle (pronounced [dəmwazɛl]) was a French courtesy title, abbreviated Mlle or Dlle, traditionally given to an unmarried woman. The equivalent in English is "Miss". The courtesy title "Madame" is accorded women where their marital status is unknown.

From around 1970 onwards, the use of the title Mademoiselle was challenged in France, particularly by feminist groups who wanted it banned. A circular from François Fillon, then Prime Minister, dated 21 February 2012, called for the deletion of the word in all official documents. On 26 December 2012, the Council of State approved the deletion.

Since at least 1748, the spelling "mam'zelle" has sometimes been used.

== See also ==
- Fräulein, a similar German term
