= Mr. =

Honorific for men

Mister, usually written in its contracted form Mr. (American and Canadian English) or Mr (British English, Australian English and New Zealand English), is a commonly used English honorific for men without a higher honorific, professional title, or any of various designations of office. The title Mr derived from earlier forms of master, as the equivalent female titles Mrs, Miss, and Ms all derived from earlier forms of mistress. Master is sometimes still used as an honorific for boys and young men.

The plural form is Messrs(.), (Note: Pronounced /ˈmɛsərz/ in English, and [mesjø] in French. The French, however, do not abbreviate messieurs as Messrs but as MM. In India, one often finds messieurs abbreviated as M/S or M/s, especially as a prefix to the name of a firm.) derived from the French title messieurs in the 18th century. Messieurs is the plural of monsieur (originally mon sieur, "my lord"), formed by declining both of its constituent parts separately.

== Historical etiquette ==
Historically, mister was applied only to those above one's own status if they had no higher title such as Sir or my lord in the English class system. That understanding is now obsolete, as it was gradually expanded as a mark of respect to those of equal status and then to all men without a higher style.

In the 19th century and earlier in Britain, two gradations of "gentleman" were recognised; the higher was entitled to use "esquire" (usually abbreviated to Esq, which followed the name), and the lower employed "Mr" before the name. Today, on correspondence from Buckingham Palace, a man who is a UK citizen is addressed with post-nominal "Esq.", and a man of foreign nationality is addressed with prefix "Mr".

In past centuries, Mr was used with a first name to distinguish among family members who might otherwise be confused in conversation: Mr Doe would be the eldest present; younger brothers or cousins were then referred to as Mr Richard Doe and Mr William Doe and so on. Such usage survived longer in family-owned business or when domestic servants were referring to adult male family members with the same surname: "Mr Robert and Mr Richard will be out this evening, but Mr Edward is dining in." In other circumstances, similar usage to indicate respect combined with familiarity is common in most anglophone cultures, including that of the southern United States.

== Professional titles ==
Mr is sometimes combined with certain titles (Mr President, Mr Speaker, Mr Justice, Mr Dean). The feminine equivalent is usually Madam although Mrs is also used in some contexts. All of these except Mr Justice are used in direct address and without the name. In certain professional contexts in different regions, Mr has specific meanings; the following are some examples.

=== Medicine ===
In the United Kingdom, Ireland and in some Commonwealth countries (such as South Africa, New Zealand and some states of Australia), many surgeons use the title Mr (or Miss, Ms, Mrs, as appropriate), rather than Dr (Doctor). Until the 19th century, earning a medical degree was not required to become a surgeon. Hence, the modern practice of reverting from Dr to Mr after successfully completing qualifying exams in surgery (e.g., Membership of the Royal College of Surgeons or the Royal Australasian College of Surgeons) is a historical reference to the origins of surgery in the United Kingdom as non-medically qualified barber surgeons.

=== Military usage ===
In the United States Army, male warrant officers are addressed as "Mister", while female warrant officers are addressed as "Miss" or "Missus", as appropriate. In the US Navy, it was once customary to address commissioned officers below the rank of commander (O-5) as "Mister"; this practice ended in 1973 after an update of the Navy Regulations, which standardised addressing all officers by rank.

In the British Armed Forces, a male warrant officer is addressed as Sir by other ranks and non-commissioned officers; commissioned officers, particularly of junior rank, should address a warrant officer using Mister and his surname, although often their rank or appointment is used, for example "Sergeant Major", "Regimental Sergeant Major", or "RSM".

In the British Armed Forces a subaltern is often referred to by his surname and the prefix Mister by both other ranks and more senior commissioned officers, e.g. "Report to Mister Smythe-Jones" rather than "Report to 2nd Lieutenant Smythe-Jones".

=== Judges ===
In the courts of England and Wales, Judges of the High Court are called, for example, Mr Justice Crane unless they are entitled to be addressed as Lord Justice. Where a forename is necessary to avoid ambiguity it is always used, for example Mr Justice Robert Goff to distinguish from a predecessor Mr Justice Goff. The female equivalent is Mrs Justice Hallett, not Madam Justice Hallett. When more than one judge is sitting and there is need to be specific, the form of address is My Lord, Mr Justice Crane. High Court Judges are entitled to be styled with the prefix The Honourable while holding office: e.g., the Honourable Mr Justice Robert Goff. In writing, such as in the law reports, the titles "Mr Justice" or "Mrs Justice" are both abbreviated to a "J" placed after the name. For example, Crane J would be substituted for Mr Justice Crane. Female judges are still properly addressed "My Lord", but "My Lady" is acceptable in modern usage.

The Chief Justice of the United States may be referred to as either "Mr Chief Justice", or "Chief Justice". For example, "Mr Chief Justice Roberts" or "Chief Justice Roberts".

=== Catholic clerics ===
Among Catholic clergy, "Mr" is the correct honorific and form of address for seminarians and other students for the priesthood. It was once the proper title for all secular clergy, including parish priests, the use of the title "Father" being reserved to religious clergy ("regulars") (Note: Religious or regular clergy belong to institutes of religion and so follow the rule of the order, and lead a life in community. Secular clergy are ordained, but do not live by a rule or lead a life "in common".) only. The use of the title "Father" for parish clergy became customary around the 1820s.

A diocesan seminarian is correctly addressed as "Mr", and once ordained a transitional deacon, is addressed in formal correspondence (though rarely in conversation) as the Reverend Mister (or "Rev. Mr"). In clerical religious institutes (those primarily made up of priests), Mr is the title given to scholastics. For instance, in the Jesuits, a man preparing for priesthood who has completed the novitiate but who is not yet ordained is properly, "Mr John Smith, SJ" and is addressed verbally as "Mister Smith"—this is to distinguish him from Jesuit brothers, and priests (although, before the 1820s, many Jesuit priests were also called "Mr"). Orders founded before the 16th century do not, as a rule, follow this practice: a Franciscan or Dominican, for instance, becomes a friar after novitiate and so is properly titled "Brother" or, if a priest, "Father".

Permanent deacons in the United States are styled as "Deacon" or "the Reverend Deacon" followed by their first and last names (e.g. "Deacon John Jones", rather than "the Reverend Mr"). It is also customary in some places, especially in the Eastern Catholic Churches, to address deacons while speaking, like presbyters, as "Father" or "Father Deacon".

== Other usages ==
- "Mister" can also be used in combination with another word to refer to someone who is regarded as the personification of, or master of, a particular field or subject, especially in the fields of popular entertainment and sports. An example of this is Formula One driver Graham Hill who was known Mr Monaco for winning the Monaco Grand Prix multiple times.
- In Italian football, deference to a coach is shown by players, staff and fans referring to him as "Il Mister", or directly, "Mister". This is traditionally attributed to the conversion of the local game of calcio to English-rules association football by British sailors, who would have been the first coaches.
- In the old Dutch title system the title "Mr" is used for a Master of Laws (LLM).

== See also ==
- Milord
- Slavic honorifics
- Sensei
- Shri
