= Master Babu Singh =

Indian politician (1922–1996)

- Born: 22 December 1922; Phul Town, District Bathinda, Punjab, Nabha Rayasat, British India
- Died: 16 September 1996 (aged 73)
- Occupation: Communist activist
- Organization: Communist Party of India

Master Babu Singh (22 December 1922 – 16 September 1996) was an Indiancommunist activist and a legislature.

== Life ==
Babu Singh was born in a Sikh family on 22 December 1922 at Phul Town. He Studied in P.P.S Nabha with Parkash singh Badal and joined as a teacher and became Master Babu Singh. after some years he decided to work in active politics. He was chosen as the President of the municipal committee.

He served for four times as a CPI Member Legislative Assembly (MLA) from Rampura Phul Assembly Constituency (1962 to 1967, 1969 to 1972 and 1977 to 1980 and 1980 to 1985.
