= Betty Boyd (disambiguation) =

Betty Boyd (1908–1971) was an American film actress.

Betty Boyd may also refer to:

- Betty Boyd (Colorado legislator) (born 1943), American politician in Colorado
- Betty Boyd (Oklahoma legislator) (1924–2011), American politician in Oklahoma

== See also ==
- Betty Boyd Caroli, American historian and biographer
- Elizabeth Boyd (c. 1710–1745), English writer and poet
- Elizabeth Reid Boyd (born 1968), Scottish author and academic
