= Sir =

Honorific title

Sir is a formal honorific address in English for men, derived from Sire in the High Middle Ages. Both are derived from the Old French "Sire" (Lord), which was brought to England by the French-speaking Normans.

Traditionally, as governed by law and custom, Sir is used for men who are knights and may belong to certain orders of chivalry, as well as later applied to baronets and other offices.

As the female equivalent for knighthood is damehood, the suo jure female equivalent term is typically Dame. The wife of a knight or baronet tends to be addressed as Lady, although a few exceptions and interchanges of these uses exist.

Additionally, since the late modern period, Sir has been used as a respectful way to address a man of superior social status or military rank. Equivalent terms of address for women are Madam (shortened to Ma'am), in addition to social honorifics such as Mrs, Ms, or Miss.

== Etymology ==
Sir derives from the honorific title sire. Sire developed alongside the word seigneur, also used to refer to a feudal lord. Both derived from the Vulgar Latin senior, sire comes from the nominative case declension senior and seigneur from the accusative case declension seniōrem.

The form 'Sir' is first documented in English in 1297, as the title of honour of a knight, and latterly a baronet, being a variant of sire, which was already used in English since at least c. 1205 (after 139 years of Norman rule) as a title placed before a name and denoting knighthood, and to address the (male) Sovereign since c. 1225, with additional general senses of 'father, male parent' from c. 1250, and 'important elderly man' from 1362.

== Entitlement to formal honorific address by region ==
=== Commonwealth of Nations ===
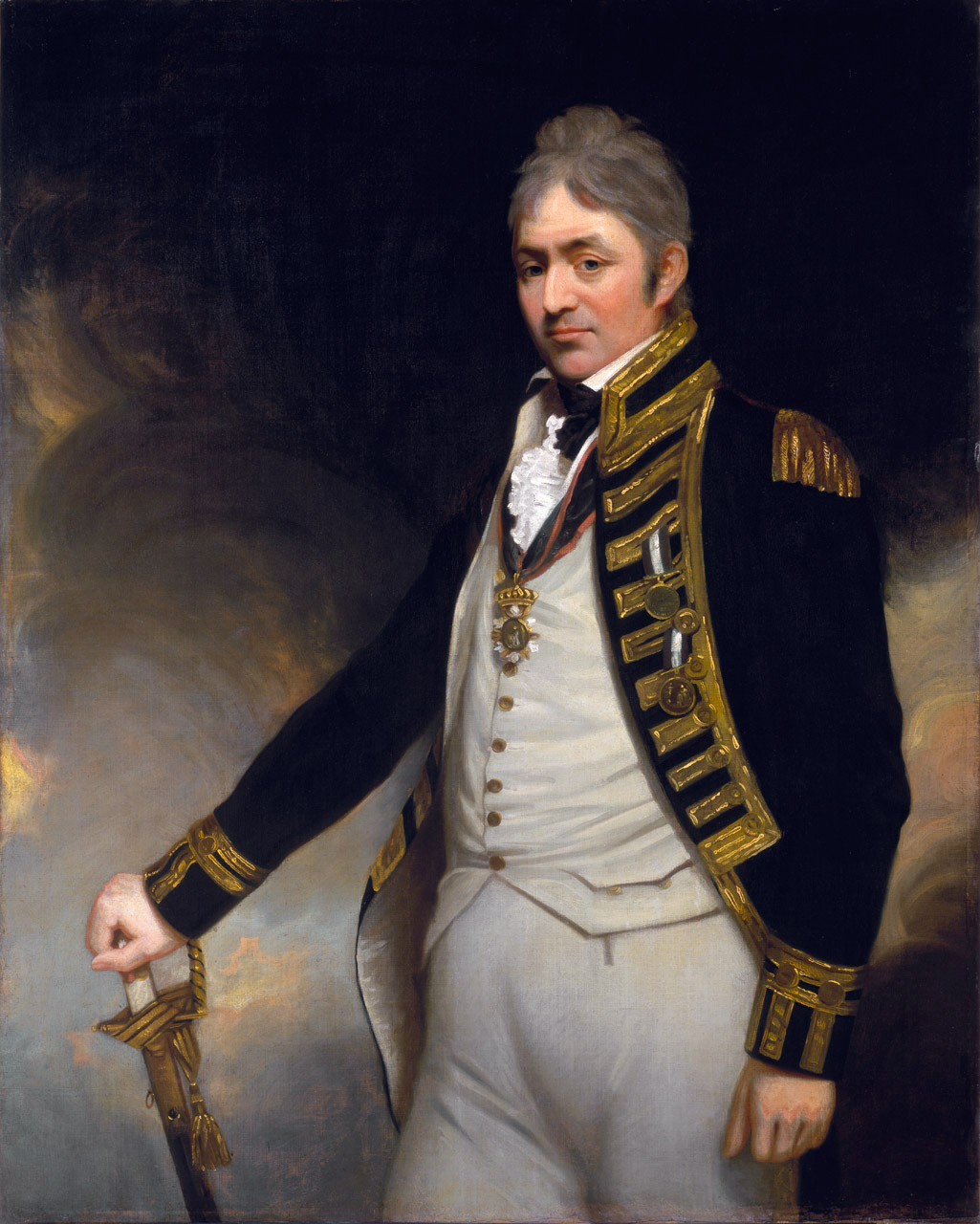
Sir Thomas Troubridge, 1st Baronet, whose entitlement to use 'Sir' derived from his position as baronet

The prefix is used with the holder's given name or full name, but never with the surname alone. For example, in written or spoken address, "Sir Alexander" and "Sir Alexander Fleming" are each correct, whilst "Sir Fleming" is incorrect.

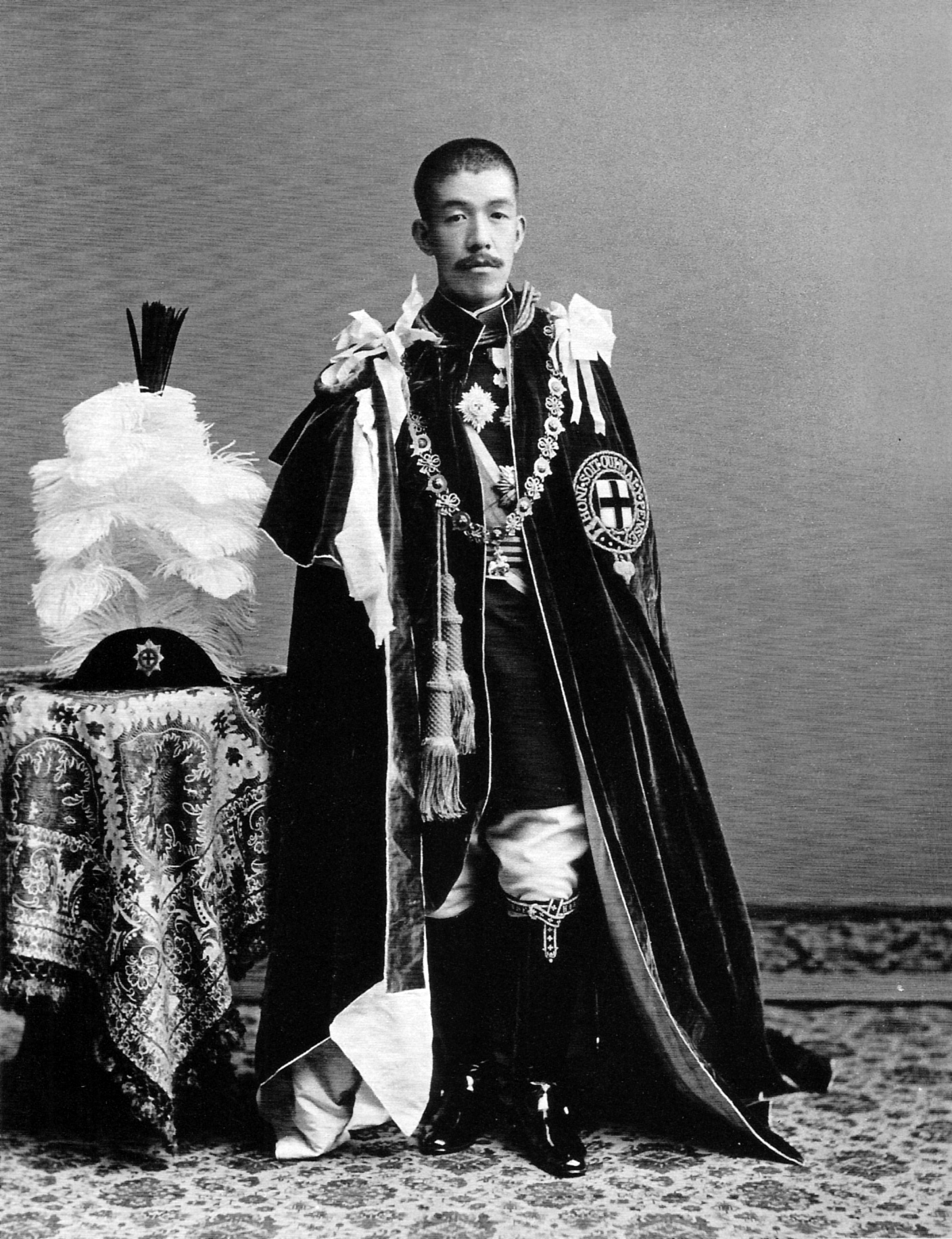
Emperor Taishō, a Stranger Knight of the Order of the Garter, who, as a foreign national, was not entitled to use the prefix 'Sir' (which as a sovereign monarch he would not have used in any case) but was permitted to post-nominally use KG

Today, in the UK and in certain Commonwealth realms, certain men are entitled to and do use the prefix 'Sir': these include knights bachelor, knights appointed to orders of chivalry, and baronets. Although foreign nationals can be awarded knighthoods, it is less common for such men to actually use the prefix, especially when they are outside the Commonwealth. Those made honorary knights do not bear the prefix "Sir" nor do they receive the accolade (they are not physically 'dubbed'); instead they use the associated post-nominal letters.

Only citizens of Commonwealth realms may receive substantive knighthoods and have the privilege of the accompanying style. In general, only knighthoods in dynastic orders – those orders in the personal gift of the sovereign and head of the Commonwealth (the Order of the Garter, the Order of the Thistle and the knighthoods in the Royal Victorian Order) – are recognised across the Commonwealth realms, along with their accompanying styles.

British knighthoods (in the Orders of the Bath, St. Michael and St. George, and in the Order of the British Empire, along with Knights Bachelor) were known as imperial honours during the existence of the British Empire. Those honours continued to be conferred as substantive, not honorary, awards by most Commonwealth realms into the 1990s. Since then, though former imperial honours are still awarded by certain Commonwealth realms, many of them have discontinued grants of British honours as they have developed their own honours systems, some of which include knighthoods. Today, British honours are only substantive for British nationals so recognised, including dual nationals, and for nationals of those realms which have retained them as part of their honours systems.

Dual national recipients of British knighthoods who hold British citizenship, such as academic and immunologist Sir John Bell, are entitled to the style of Sir as their knighthoods are substantive. This may not necessarily be the case for dual nationals who are not British citizens and who instead hold citizenship of another Commonwealth realm. In 1974, Lynden Pindling, the prime minister of the Bahamas, recommended dual Bahamian-American citizen Sidney Poitier for an honorary knighthood as an honorary Knight Commander of the Order of the British Empire (KBE), an imperial honour, as the Bahamas did not have its own honours system at the time. Although Poitier, as a Bahamian citizen by descent, was eligible for a substantive ('ordinary') award of the KBE, the Bahamian government preferred the knighthood to be honorary as Poitier was permanently residing in the United States. Knighthoods in the gift of the government of a Commonwealth realm only permit the bearer to use his style within that country or as its official representative, provided he is a national of that country; knighthoods granted by other realms may be considered foreign honours. For instance, Anthony Bailey was reprimanded by Buckingham Palace and the British government in 2016 for asserting that an honorary Antiguan knighthood (which was revoked in 2017) allowed him the style of 'Sir' in the UK.

The equivalent for a female who holds a knighthood or baronetcy in her own right is 'Dame', and follows the same usage customs as 'Sir'. Although this form was previously also used for the wives of knights and baronets, it is now customary to refer to them as 'Lady', followed by their surname; they are never addressed using their full names. For example, while Lady Fiennes is correct, Lady Virginia and Lady Virginia Fiennes are not. The widows of knights retain the style of wives of knights, however widows of baronets are either referred to as 'dowager', or use their forename before their courtesy style. For example, the widow of Sir Thomas Herbert Cochrane Troubridge, 4th Baronet, would either be known as Dowager Lady Troubridge or Laura, Lady Troubridge.

==== Barbados ====
Prior to becoming a republic in November 2021, Barbados awarded the title Knight or Dame of St. Andrew within the Order of Barbados. This practice has now been discontinued, though individuals who received a knighthood or damehood when the country was still a Commonwealth realm may continue to use the titles "Sir" and "Dame" within their lifetimes.

==== Commonwealth realms ====
- Knight Commander or Knight Grand Cross of the Royal Victorian Order (KCVO/GCVO) (Note: In the personal gift of the Sovereign and Head of the Commonwealth.)

===== United Kingdom =====
- Baronet (Bt.)
- Knight of the Order of the Garter (KG)
- Knight of the Order of the Thistle (KT)
- Knight Commander or Knight Grand Cross of the Order of the Bath (KCB/GCB)
- Knight Commander or Knight Grand Cross of the Order of St Michael and St George (KCMG/GCMG)
- Knight Commander or Knight Grand Cross of the Order of the British Empire (KBE/GBE)
- Knight Bachelor

===== Antigua and Barbuda =====
- Knight of the Order of the National Hero (KNH)
- Knight Commander, Knight Grand Cross, or Knight Grand Collar of the Order of the Nation (KCN/KGCN/KGN)

===== Australia =====
- Knight of the Order of Australia (AK; discontinued 1986–2014, reintroduced briefly in 2014, again discontinued in 2015)

===== Grenada =====
- Knight Commander, Knight Grand Cross, or Knight Grand Collar of the Order of the Nation in the Order of Grenada (KCNG/GCNG/KN)

===== New Zealand =====
- Knight Companion or Knight Grand Companion of the New Zealand Order of Merit (KNZM/GNZM)

===== Saint Lucia =====
- Knight Commander of the Order of Saint Lucia (KCSL)

==== India ====
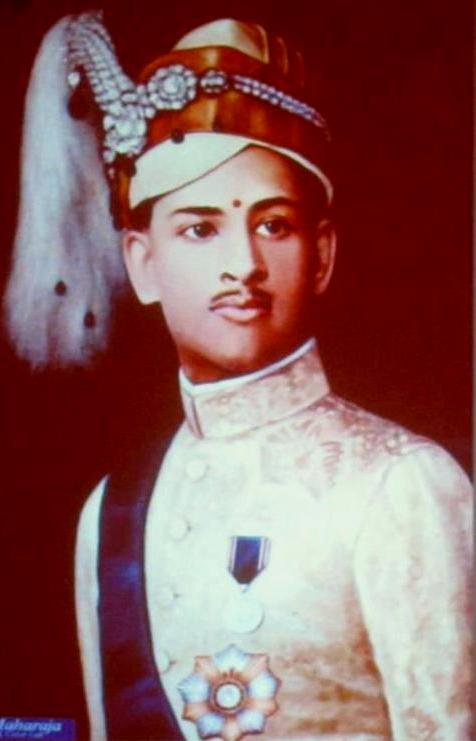
Chithira Thirunal Balarama Varma was the last surviving Knight Grand Commander of the Order of the Star of India.

As part of the consolidation of the crown colony of India, the Order of the Star of India was established in 1861 to reward prominent British and Indian civil servants, military officers and prominent Indians associated with the Indian Empire. The Order of the Indian Empire was established in 1878 as a junior-level order to accompany the Order of the Star of India, and to recognise long service.

From 1861 to 1866, the Order of the Star of India had a single class of Knights (KSI), who were entitled to the style of 'Sir'. In 1866, the order was reclassified into three divisions: Knights Grand Commander (GCSI), Knights Commander (KCSI) and Companions (CSI); holders of the upper two degrees could use the title 'Sir'. From its creation in 1878 until 1887, the Order of the Indian Empire had a single class, Companion (CIE), which did not entitle the recipient to a style of knighthood.

In 1887, two higher divisions, Knight Grand Commander (GCIE) and Knight Commander (KCIE) were created, which entitled holders of those ranks to the style of 'Sir'. The last creations of knights of either order were made on 15 August 1947 upon Indian independence. All British honours and their accompanying styles were officially made obsolete in India when the Dominion of India became a modern republic in the Commonwealth of Nations in 1950, followed by Islamic Republic of Pakistan in 1956.

The Order of the Star of India became dormant in the Commonwealth realms from February 2009, and the Order of the Indian Empire after August 2010, when the last knights of the orders died.

==== Nigeria ====
In Nigeria, holders of religious honours like the Knighthood of St. Gregory make use of the word as a pre-nominal honorific in much the same way as it is used for secular purposes in Britain and the Philippines. Wives of such individuals also typically assume the title of Lady.

=== Non-Commonwealth Countries ===
==== Holy See ====
Knights and Dames of papal orders may elect the "Sir" or "Dame" prefix with post-nominal letters, subject to the laws and conventions of the country they are in. The Pope, the sovereign of the Catholic Church and Vatican City, delegates the awarding orders of knighthood to bishops and Grand Masters. Their precedence is as follows:

- Supreme Order of Christ (Vacant)
- Order of the Golden Spur (Vacant)
- Order of Pope Pius IX
- Order of St. Gregory the Great
- Order of St. Sylvester
- Order of the Holy Sepulchre
- Sovereign Military Order of Malta

For Example, Sir Burton P. C. Hall, KSS, KCHS would be the correct style for lay knights.

Lieutenants of the Order of the Holy Sepulchre, are styled as "Your Excellency", such as H.E. Dame Trudy Comeau, DC*HS.

Catholic clergy who are invested as Knight Chaplains may use post-nominal letters, but must retain their clerical titles, like Rev. Robert Skeris, KCHS.

Knights and Dames of papal orders are not allowed to use the prefix "Sir" or "Dame" in the United Kingdom, although they may use post-nominal letters. Not allowing the prefix is because the use of foreign titles is not permitted by the British Crown without a Royal Licence, and as a matter of policy (currently based on a Royal Warrant of 27 April 1932), a Royal Licence to bear any foreign title is never granted. On the other hand, allowing the post-nominal letters would be explained by the highest and lowest dignities being universal, a king was recognized as king everywhere, and also a knight: "though a Knight receive his Dignity of a Foreign Prince, he is so to be stiled in all Legal Proceedings within England .. and Knights in all Foreign Countries have ever place and precedency according to their Seniority of being Knighted"

==== Ireland ====
Established in 1783 and primarily awarded to men associated with the Kingdom of Ireland, Knights of the Order of St. Patrick were entitled to the style of 'Sir'. Regular creation of new knights of the order ended in 1921 upon the formation of the Irish Free State. With the death of the last knight in 1974, the Order became dormant.

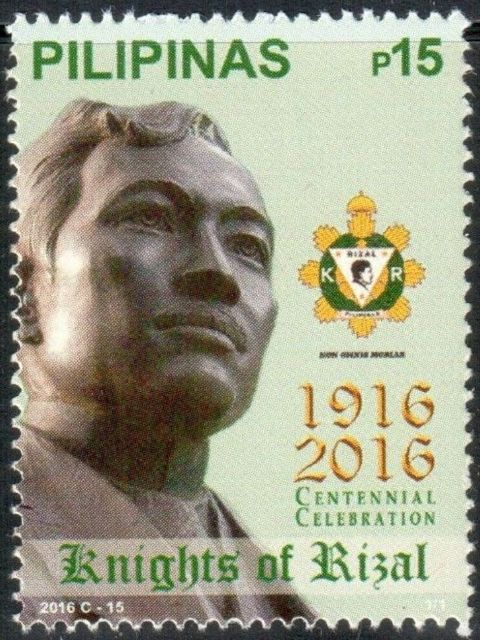
Centennial stamp celebrating the Knights of Rizal released by PhilPost with a profile of Jose Rizal and the badge of the Order visible.

==== Philippines ====
Knights of Rizal (Orden de Caballeros de Rizál) is the sole order of knighthood of the Philippines currently constituted by legislative charter and recognized by the Orders, decorations, and medals of the Philippines.

Knights are entitled to prefix Sir to their first names while their wives prefix Lady to their first names. These apply to both spoken and written forms of address. Knights may also append the relevant post-nominal of their rank to the end of their names: Knight of Rizal (KR), Knight Officer of Rizal (KOR), Knight Commander of Rizal (KCR), Knight Grand Officer of Rizal (KGOR) and Knight Grand Cross of Rizal (KGCR). Knighthood may be conferred to both citizens and noncitizens of the Philippines. All knighthoods are substantive and the honorific may be used by all knights of the Order.

Notable members of the Order include King Juan Carlos I of Spain who was conferred a Knight Grand Cross of Rizal on 11 February 1998, Nobel Peace Prize winner and former US Secretary of State Sir Henry Kissinger, former Philippine President Sir Benigno Aquino III, and former Chief Justice of the Supreme Court of the Philippines and drafter of the 1987 Philippine constitution The Honourable Sir Hilario Davide, Jr.

=== Combinations with other titles and styles ===
==== Military ====
In the case of a military officer who is also a knight, the appropriate form of address puts the professional military rank first, then the correct manner of address for the individual, then his name. Examples include:

- Admiral of the Fleet Sir Bruce Fraser, GCB, KBE (after 1941)
- Field Marshal Sir Thomas Blamey, GBE, KCB, CMG, DSO, ED (after 1941)

==== Academic ====
This is also the case with academic ranks and titles, such as 'Professor'. For example, Patrick Bateson was both a professor (Note: Note a difference in usage between British and US usage. A Professor in the UK is only used for the highest academic rank. See a summary here.) and a knight bachelor; his correct title would be Professor Sir Patrick Bateson. However, the title of 'Doctor' (Dr.) is not used in combination with 'Sir', with the knighthood taking precedence. Knighted doctors are addressed as knights, though they may still use any post-nominal letters associated with their degrees.

==== Ecclesiastical ====
Church of England clergy who receive knighthoods following their ordination do not receive an accolade and therefore do not use the title 'Sir', but instead refer to their knighthood using post-nominal letters. For example, the Reverend John Polkinghorne, KBE would never be referred to as Sir John Polkinghorne. If, however, an Anglican clergyman inherits a baronetcy or was knighted before his ordination, he will retain his style and title. For instance, Sir Nicholas Beatson-Bell KCSI, KCIE, who was a knighted Indian Civil Service officer and imperial administrator before entering the ministry, added the style of The Reverend to his secular honorific of Sir, thus becoming the Revd. Sir Nicholas Beatson-Bell KCSI, KCIE. Clergy of other denominations may use different conventions.

==== Peers and nobility ====
Peers who have been knighted are neither styled as 'Sir' nor addressed as such in the formal sense of the style, as their titles of nobility take precedence. The same principle applies for the male heir apparent to a dukedom, marquessate or earldom, his eldest legitimate son (if he is the heir to a dukedom or marquessate with additional subsidiary peerages), and for the legitimate male issue of a duke or a marquess, who are styled 'Lord' followed by their first name. For instance, diplomat Lord Nicholas Gordon-Lennox, KCMG, KCVO, who was a younger son of the Duke of Richmond, continued to be styled as 'Lord Nicholas' following his knighthood in 1986, not 'Lord Sir Nicholas'. Other male heirs of an earl who lack courtesy titles, and the male heirs of a viscount or baron, do however use the style of 'Sir' if knighted, the style following that of 'The Hon', for example The Honourable Sir Charles Algernon Parsons, OM, KCB, FRS.

== Educational, military and other usage ==
=== Education system ===
'Sir', along with 'Miss' for women, is commonly used in the British school system to address teachers and other members of staff. Usage of these terms is considered a mark of respect, and can be dated back to the 16th century. The practice may have been an attempt to reinforce the authority of teachers from lower social classes among classes of largely upper class students. Jennifer Coates, emeritus professor of English language and linguistics at Roehampton University, has criticised the use of the title for male teachers, saying that "'Sir' is a knight. There weren't women knights, but 'Miss' is ridiculous: it doesn't match 'Sir' at all. It's just one of the names you can call an unmarried woman", and that "It's a depressing example of how women are given low status and men, no matter how young or new in the job they are, are given high status". This view is not unchallenged, however. The chief executive of the Brook Learning Trust, Debbie Coslett, said "... they call me 'Miss', I'm fine with that. They're showing respect by giving me a title rather than 'hey' or 'oi, you' or whatever", and dismissed the male/female issue as "just the way the English language works".

In the Southern United States, the term 'sir' is often used to address someone in a position of authority or respect, and is commonly used in schools and universities by students to address their teachers and professors. Whereas the British and Commonwealth female equivalent is Miss, students will often refer to female teachers as Ma'am.

In the Northeast United States, particularly New England, there remains influence of both the British and French traditions as noted above; in general parlance, teachers, authority-figures, and so forth, are referred to by a title of respect such as 'Sir' for males and 'Miss', 'Ms', or 'Mrs' for females: 'Miss' for unmarried, younger females; 'Ms' for senior, elder, or ranking females that may or may not be married; and 'Mrs' for married or widowed females.

=== Military and police ===
If not specifically using their rank or title, 'sir' is used in the United States Armed Forces to address a male commissioned officer. Lower-ranking and non-commissioned officers, such as corporals or sergeants, are addressed using their ranks, though in some of the branches (to be precise, in the Air Force, Marine Corps and Coast Guard) "sir" can also be used to address a drill instructor although he is an NCO.

In the British Armed Forces, male commissioned officers and warrant officers are addressed as 'sir' by all ranks junior to them, male warrant officers are addressed as Mr by commissioned officers.

In the Royal Canadian Mounted Police (RCMP), only commissioned officers are addressed as 'sir'; NCOs and constables are addressed by their rank. Male British police officers of the rank of Inspector or above are addressed as 'Sir' (women of inspecting rank are called Ma'am).

In the Hong Kong Police Force, male superiors are respectfully known by their surname followed by 'sir'. For example, Inspector Wong would be addressed or referred to as 'Wong-sir'. Male police officers are sometimes known colloquially as "Ah-sir" (阿Sir) to the wider public.

=== Service industry ===
The term 'Sir' is also used frequently in the customer service industry, by employees to refer to customers, and sometimes vice versa. In the United States, it is much more common in certain areas (even when addressing male peers or men considerably younger). For example, a 1980 study showed that 80% of service interactions in the South were accompanied by 'Sir' or Ma'am, in comparison to the Northern United States, where 'Sir' was only used 25% of the time.

'Sir', in conjunction with 'Ma'am' or 'Madam', is also commonly used in the Philippines and South Asia, not only to address customers and vice versa, but also to address people of a higher social rank or age.

== See also ==
- Style (manner of address)
- Knight
  - Order of chivalry
  - Knight Bachelor
- Salutation
- Canadian titles debate
- Shri, Sriman
