= Sire =

Form of address to reigning kings

Sire (/saɪər/, French pronunciation: [siʁ]) is an archaic respectful form of address to reigning kings in Europe. In French and other languages it is rare but used in literary contexts.

The words "sire" and "sir", as well as the French "(mon)sieur", the Spanish "señor", and the Portuguese "senhor", share a common etymological origin, all ultimately being related to the Latin senior. The female equivalent form of address is dame or dam.

== See also ==
- Forms of address in the United Kingdom
- King
- Nobility
