= Fräulein =

German honorific for an unmarried woman

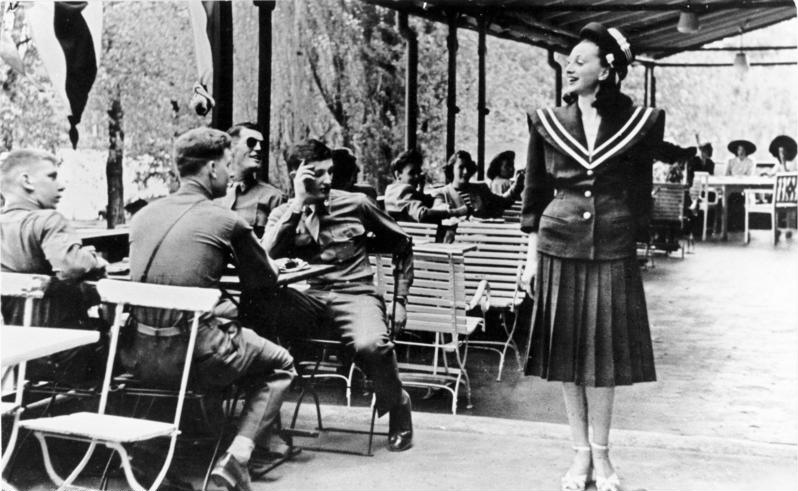
A scene in post-war Germany (1946): a Fräulein (a Miss, unmarried woman) in an American garden club. The large number of attractive young women in Germany resulted in the notion of the Fräuleinwunder (lit. 'Miracle of the Miss').

Fräulein (/ˈfrɔɪ.laɪn/ FROY-lyne, German: [ˈfʁɔʏlaɪn]) is the traditional German language honorific for unmarried women, comparable to Miss in English and Mademoiselle in French.

== Description ==
Fräulein is the diminutive form of Frau, which was previously reserved only for married women.

Frau is in origin the equivalent of "my lady" or "Madam", a form of address of a noblewoman. But by an ongoing process of devaluation of honorifics, it came to be used as the unmarked term for "woman" by about 1800. Therefore, Fräulein came to be interpreted as expressing a "diminutive of woman", as it were, implying that a Fräulein is not-quite-a-woman. By the 1960s, this came to be seen as patronising by proponents of feminism, partly because there is no equivalent male diminutive, and during the 1970s and 1980s, the term Fräulein became nearly taboo in urban and official settings, while it remained an unmarked standard in many rural areas. It is seen as sexist by modern feminists.

This process was somewhat problematic, at least during the 1970s to 1980s, since many unmarried women of the older generation insisted on Fräulein as a term of distinction, respecting their status, and took the address of Frau as offensive or suggestive of extra-marital sexual experience.

From the 1970s, Fräulein was used less often, and it was banned from official use in West Germany in 1972 by the Minister of the Interior. Nevertheless, the word, as a title of address and in other uses, continues to be used, albeit in much reduced frequency.

Nowadays, style guides and dictionaries recommend that all women be addressed as Frau regardless of marital status, particularly in formal situations. A newsletter published on the website of the German dictionary Duden in 2002, for instance, noted that women should only be addressed as Fräulein when they specifically request this form of address.

One area in which the word still sees wide use is in the form of an admonishing address towards girls until about their mid-teens, usually by a parent.

== See also ==
- List of German expressions in English
