= Monsieur =

Royal Style or title

Monsieur (/məˈsjɜːr/ mə-SYUR; French: [məsjø]; pl. Messieurs /ˈmɛsərz, meɪˈsjɜːr(z)/ MESS-ərz, may-SYUR(Z); French: [mesjø]; 1512, from Middle French mon sieur, literally "my lord") is an honorific title that was used to refer to or address the eldest living brother of the king in the French royal court. It has now become the customary French title of respect and term of address for a French-speaking man, corresponding to such English titles as Mr. or sir.

== History ==
Under the Ancien Régime, the court title of Monsieur referred to the next brother in the line of succession of the King of France. It was always used for referring to the prince, not as a style. The Kings' brothers were addressed as Monseigneur or Royal Highness.

Hercule François, Duke of Anjou and Alençon (1555–1584), was the first notable member of the royalty to assume the title without the use of an adjoining proper name. In 1576, Monsieur pressured his brother King Henry III of France into signing the Edict of Beaulieu and effectively ending the Fifth Religious War of France. The resulting peace became popularly known as the Peace of Monsieur.

The title was later assumed by Gaston, Duke of Orléans, brother of Louis XIII, and then Philippe I, Duke of Orléans, brother of Louis XIV. From 1643 to 1660, while both princes were alive, Philippe was commonly known as le Petit Monsieur, while Gaston, his uncle, was known as le Grand Monsieur.

For over seventy years, from 1701 to 1774, the title had no living representatives in the French court, as Philippe I of Orléans died in 1701; Louis XV was the youngest of the sons of Louis, Duke of Burgundy and at the time of his accession to the throne in 1715 had no brothers.

The title was restored in 1775 for Louis Stanislas Xavier, Count of Provence, the oldest surviving brother of the reigning Louis XVI, who assumed the title of Louis XVIII in pretence in 1795. After his coronation in 1814, the title passed to Charles Philippe, Count of Artois, his younger brother. Charles Philippe, who led the ultras during the Bourbon Restoration and became King Charles X in 1824, was the last royal sibling to officially hold the title of Monsieur. His successor, Louis Philippe I, the next and last king to rule France, had lost both his brothers, Louis Charles and Antoine Philippe, many years before he succeeded to the throne.

A fuller list of those who have been known by this title includes:

- Charles, Duke of Orléans (1559–1560)
- Henri, Duke of Anjou (1560–1574)
- François, Duke of Anjou (1555–1584)
- Gaston, Duke of Orléans (1611–1643)
- Philippe, Duke of Orléans (1643–1701)
- Louis Stanislas, Count of Provence (1774–1793)
- Charles Philippe, Count of Artois (1795–1823)

== Modern usage ==
In modern French, monsieur (plural messieurs) is used as a courtesy title of respect, an equivalent of English "mister" or "sir". It can be abbreviated in M. (plural MM.), Mssr. (plural Mssrs.), and rarely M^{r} (plural M^{rs}), but never Mr., which is only for Mister.

== See also ==
- Dauphin
- Fils de France
- Madame Royale
- Madame
- Milord
- Petit-Fils de France
- Prince du Sang
