= Elizabeth Reid Boyd =

Scottish author and gender studies academic

Elizabeth Reid Boyd (born 24 August 1968) is a Scottish born author and academic in Gender Studies at Edith Cowan University in Western Australia whose romance fiction is published by Harlequin under her natural pen name Eliza Redgold. She defends the romance novel as a form of feminism.
