= Noun of address =

Phrase used to identify the addressee of an utterance

In linguistics, a noun of address, also called a noun of direct address, a vocative expression, a noun addressive, or simply an address, a vocative, or an addressive, is a noun or noun phrase (sometimes called a "noun phrase of address" or "complex addressive") used to identify the addressee of an utterance. It is not to be confused with the related but distinct vocative case or honorific title.

== Examples and use ==
Syntactically, a noun of address is a noun phrase that is isolated from the structure of its containing sentence, not being a dependent of the verb. The underlined words and phrases in each of the following English sentences are examples of nouns of address:

Your table is ready, sir.
I'm afraid, Mr. Renault, that your card has been declined.
Quit playing around, silly.
Mom, what time is Dad getting back?
You on the scooter, stop!
What's your question, woman third row from the back?
Whoever wants to keep his job, be sure to come in on time tomorrow.
Someone else, give the prize wheel a spin!
Grandma? Is that you?
Sprinkles! Sprinkles! Oh, where is that cat?!
You two, come with me.

A noun of address is not merely a noun or noun phrase separated from a sentence and used similarly to an interjection; it must address someone or something by name or descriptively. For example, a cry of "Fire!" is not a noun of address, nor is the greeting "Congratulations!"

Sometimes an original noun of address can become an interjection. For example, in English the word dude is often used without any reference to the addressee(s): One can say, "Dude, what a night!" to a group of people without changing to Dudes, or it can be used without address to anyone. The exclamation "Dude!" when used by itself can carry meaning on its own, to express surprise or delight.

In English, the particle O can be used, particularly in archaic, poetic, or literary contexts and in set phrases, to add emphasis to any noun of address, as in, "Arise, O Lord." This usage is distinct from interjectional oh, although the two are subject to confusion.

== Relation to the vocative case ==
In some languages, nouns of address are marked morphologically with a particular grammatical case, the vocative case. A famous example of the vocative case can be seen in Latin:

Et tū, Brūte?

This means "And you, Brutus?" Brūte is the vocative case form of Brūtus, which is in the nominative case.

English lacks a vocative case (i.e., words are not inflected differently when they are used in address), but it sets nouns of address off from their containing sentence in speech by a particular intonational pattern, and in writing by the use of commas or sometimes dashes. English nouns of address can also be used in isolation or separated from a following sentence by an exclamation point or question mark.

== Semantics ==
The particular choice of noun of address may indicate the relative social status or familiarity of the speakers. For example, sir and madam are considered polite terms to use when addressing strangers or, in some cases, those of higher social standing.

According to some frameworks, the semantic functions of nouns of address can be divided into two main categories: calls and addresses. A call serves to catch the attention of the person being addressed, or to pick them out from a larger pool of potential addressees, as in the following examples:

Hey, lady, you dropped your wallet!
You in the red shirt, get over here.

An address merely serves to reiterate, clarify, or emphasize the connection between the speaker and the addressee, as in:

You've made an excellent choice, my dear boy.
Margaret, do you want me to pick something up at the store?

Another framework divides nouns of address into addresses, appeals, and invocations.

== See also ==
- Apostrophe (figure of speech)
- Vocative case
- Term of address
- Interjection
- Kinship terminology
