= Mistress (form of address) =

Old form of address for a woman

Mistress is an old form of address for a woman. It was used as a title of respect for women of authority, respect, or social status. The title did not necessarily distinguish between married and unmarried women. The titles Mrs., Miss and Ms. are abbreviations derived from Mistress. The word mistress comes from the Anglo-Norman and Middle French maistresse, which itself derives from a combination of maistre, meaning master, and the suffix -esse.

Mastress is an obsolete form.

An example is Mistress Quickly in Shakespeare's The Merry Wives of Windsor.

== See also ==
- Master (form of address)
