= Mrs. =

Honorific for women who are married

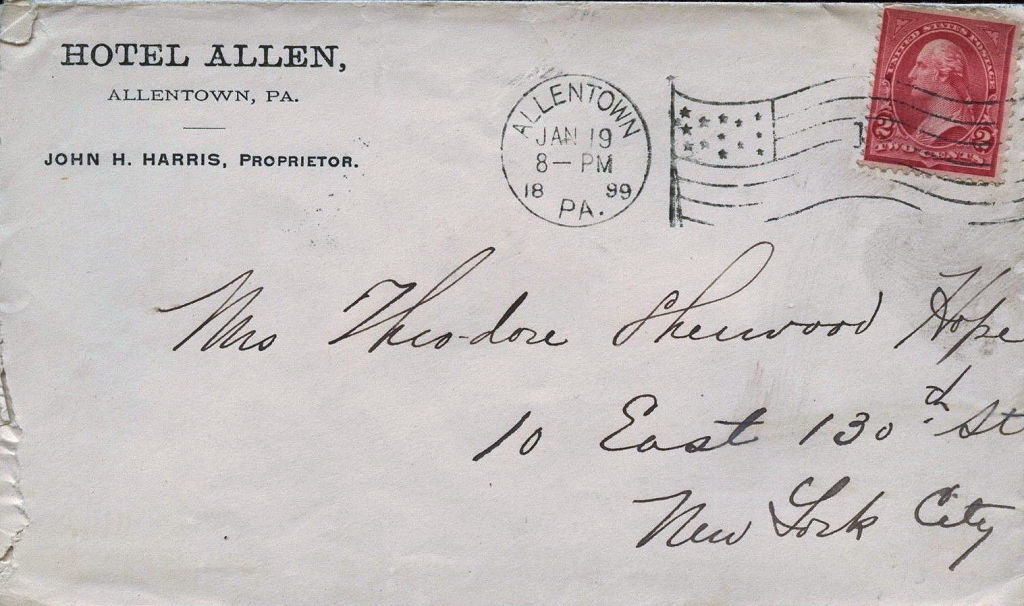
Mrs. used in 1899 to distinguish a married woman from her husband whose name she is using

Mrs. (American English) or Mrs (British English, Australian English and New Zealand English ; standard English pronunciation: /ˈmɪsɪz/ MISS-iz) is a commonly used English honorific for women, usually for those who are married and without a higher honorific, professional title, or any of various designations of office. In most Commonwealth countries, a full stop (period) is usually not used with the title. In the United States and Canada a period (full stop) is usually used (see Abbreviation).

Mrs. originated as a contraction of the honorific Mistress (the feminine of Mister or Master) which was originally applied to both married and unmarried women in the upper class. Writers who used Mrs for unmarried women include Daniel Defoe, Samuel Richardson, Henry Fielding, and Samuel Johnson. The split into Mrs for married women and Miss for unmarried began during the 17th century, but was not reliable until well into the 19th century.

It is rare for Mrs. to be written in a non-abbreviated form, and the unabbreviated word lacks a standard spelling. In literature it may appear as missus or missis in dialogue. A variant in the works of Thomas Hardy and others is "Mis'ess", reflecting its etymology. Misses has been used but is ambiguous, as this is a commonly used plural for Miss. The plural of Mrs. is from the French: Mesdames. This may be used as is in written correspondence, or it may be abbreviated Mmes.

== Traditional usage ==
Originally, Mrs was used with a woman's own first name and married surname. Abigail Adams, for example, was addressed as Mrs. Abigail Adams. In the 19th century, it became common to use the husband's first name instead of the wife's. Jane Austen gave some of the earliest examples of that form when she wrote of Mrs. John Dashwood. By the early 20th century, that usage was standard, and the forms Mrs Jane Smith, Mrs Miller (wife of John Smith), or Mrs Miller-Smith were considered incorrect by many etiquette writers. Many feminists (such as Elizabeth Cady Stanton, Lucy Stone, and Charlotte Perkins Gilman) objected, but they disagreed on whether the problem was the title Mrs or the husband's first name or the husband's surname.

In several languages, the title for married women such as Madame, Señora, Signora, or Frau, is the direct feminine equivalent of the title used for men; the title for unmarried women is a diminutive: Mademoiselle, Señorita, Signorina, or Fräulein. For this reason, usage had shifted toward using the married title as the default for all women in professional usage. This had long been followed in the United Kingdom for some high-ranking household staff, such as housekeepers, cooks, and nannies, who were called Mrs. as a mark of respect regardless of marital status.

In the United Kingdom, the traditional form for a divorcée was Mrs Jane Smith. In the U.S., the divorcée originally retained her full married name unless she remarried. Later, the form Mrs. Miller Smith was sometimes used, with the birth surname in place of the first name. However, the form Mrs. Jane Miller eventually became widely used for divorcées, even in formal correspondence; that is, Mrs. preceded the divorcée's maiden name.

Before social mores relaxed to the point where single women with children were socially acceptable, the unwed mother was often advised by etiquette mavens like Emily Post to use Mrs. with her maiden name to avoid scrutiny.

The separation of Miss and Mrs. became problematic as more women entered the white-collar workforce because it was difficult to change names and titles when they had already established a career. Women who became famous or well known in their professional circles before marriage often kept their birth names, stage names, or pen names. Miss became the appellation for celebrities (e.g., Miss Helen Hayes, or Miss Amelia Earhart) but this also proved problematic, as when a married woman did use her husband’s last name but was still referred to as Miss; see more at Ms. and Miss.

== Modern usage ==
It is now very uncommon for a woman to be addressed by her husband's first name; however, this still sometimes occurs if a couple is being addressed jointly, such as in Mr. and Mrs. John Smith.

Many married women still use the title with their spouse's last name but retaining their first name (e.g., Mrs Jane Smith). Other married women choose not to adopt their spouse's last name at all. It is generally considered polite to address a woman by Ms. rather than Mrs., unless the preference of the woman in question is clearly known. This is especially true in written communication, as dictated by professional etiquette.

Modern etiquette provides various options in addressing married couples in which the wife uses her own last name, or uses a title such as Dr., Mayor, or Ms.. Etiquette-writer Judith Martin ("Miss Manners") generally advises that, in non-standard situations, the individuals be addressed on separate lines when writing invitations (e.g., "Dr. Sue Martin/Mr. John Martin").

In direct address, a woman with the title Mrs. may be addressed Mrs. [Lastname], or with the stand-alone Madam or Ma'am, although the latter two are more-often used for any adult woman, regardless of marital status, in modern conversation.

== See also ==
- Mr
- Ms
- Mx
- Personal name
