= Master (form of address) =

English honorific for young men and boys

Master is an English honorific for boys and young men. It is usually abbreviated to MSTR or Mstr.

== Etymology ==
Master was used in England for men of some rank, especially "free masters" of a trade guild and by any manual worker or servant employee addressing his employer (his master), but also generally by those lower in status to gentlemen, priests, or scholars. In the Elizabethan period, it was used between equals, especially to a group ("My masters"), mainly by urban artisans and tradespeople. It was later extended to all respectable men and was the forerunner of Mister. The proper title of William Shakespeare's First Folio is pronounced Master William Shakespeare's Comedies, Histories, & Tragedies.

After its replacement in common speech by Mister, Master was retained as a form of address only for boys who had not yet entered society. By the late 19th century, etiquette dictated that men be addressed as Mister, and boys as Master.

== Current usage in the United Kingdom ==
The use of Master as a prefixed title is, according to Leslie Dunkling, "a way of addressing politely a boy ... too young to be called 'Mister'." It can be used as a title and form of address for any boy.

Master was used sometimes, especially up to the late 19th century, to describe the male head of a large estate or household who employed domestic workers.

The heir to a Scottish peerage may use the style or dignity "Master of" followed by the name associated with the peerage. For instance, the heir of Lord Elphinstone is known as the Master of Elphinstone.

== Current usage in the United States ==
Nancy Tuckerman, in the Amy Vanderbilt Complete Book of Etiquette, writes that in the United States, unlike the UK, a boy can be addressed as Master only until age 12, then is addressed only by his name with no title until he turns 18, when he takes the title of Mr., although it is not improper to use Mr. if he is slightly younger.

According to the protocol reference "Honor and Respect", used as a standard worldwide, "use of Master [as] an honorific when addressing boys is considered old fashioned outside of conservative circles."

== Other extant usage ==
In the 21st century, Master as an honorific or more often master as a professional term still has some use in reference to advanced workers (not always male) in the trades, and sometimes also to academics and educators. However, it is more frequently used as an adjective for this purpose (e.g. "master bricklayer"), or with an adjective ("school master", "headmaster").
