= Miss =

Honorific for an unmarried woman

Miss (pronounced /ˈmɪs/) is an English-language honorific typically used for a girl, for an unmarried woman (when not using another title such as "Doctor" or "Dame"), or for a married woman retaining her maiden name. Originating in the 17th century, it is a contraction of mistress. The plural of Miss is Misses or occasionally Mses.

== History ==
=== Origins ===
Like Ms and Mrs, Miss has its roots in the title Mistress. Miss was originally a title given primarily to children rather than adults. During the 1700s, its usage broadened to encompass adult women. The title emerged as a polite way to address women, reflecting changing societal norms and class distinctions. Prior to this, referring to an adult woman as a Miss might have carried connotations of prostitution.

=== Evolution of meanings and usage ===
The meanings of both Miss and Mrs underwent transformations over time. Historically, these titles did not solely indicate marital status. Even after the adoption of Miss by many adult single women in 18th-century England, Mrs continued to signify social or business standing, rather than merely marital status, until at least the mid-19th century.

=== Racial discrimination ===
Being addressed with "Miss" or "Mrs." was frequently denied to Black women in the Southern United States in the past. Mary Hamilton, a civil rights protester arrested in 1963 in Gadsden, Alabama, refused to answer the prosecutor in a subsequent hearing unless he stopped addressing her as "Mary", demanding that instead she be called "Miss Hamilton". She was subsequently jailed for contempt of court after refusing to pay a fine. This led to Hamilton v. Alabama, 376 U.S. 650 (1964), a United States Supreme Court case in which the court held that Mary Hamilton was entitled to the same courteous forms of address customarily reserved solely for whites in the southern United States and that calling a Black person by her or his first name in a formal context was "a form of racial discrimination."

== See also ==
- Fräulein, the German equivalent of Miss
- Fröken, an archaic Swedish equivalent of Miss
- Mademoiselle, the French equivalent of Miss
- Señorita, the Spanish equivalent of Miss
