= Ms. =

English honorific title for women

Ms. (American English) or Ms (British English, Australian English and New Zealand English; normally /ˈmɪz/, but also /məz/, or /məs/ when unstressed) is an English-language honorific used with the last name or full name of a woman, intended as a default form of address for women regardless of marital status. Like Miss and Mrs., the term Ms. has its origins in the female English title once used for all women, Mistress, the feminine form of Mister and Master. It originated in the 17th century and was revived into mainstream usage in the 20th century.

It is followed by a full stop, or period, in Canada and the United States, but not in other English-speaking countries.

== Historical development and revival of the term ==
Miss and Mrs., both derived from the then formal Mistress, like Mister did not originally indicate marital status. Ms. was another acceptable, but rarely used, abbreviation for Mistress in England in the 17th and 18th centuries. During the 19th century, however, Mrs. and Miss came to be associated almost exclusively with marital status, and Ms. was popularized as an alternative in the late 20th century.

The earliest known proposal for the modern revival of Ms. as a title appeared in The Republican of Springfield, Massachusetts, on November 10, 1901:

There is a void in the English language which, with some diffidence, we undertake to fill. Every one has been put in an embarrassing position by ignorance of the status of some woman. To call a maiden Mrs is only a shade worse than to insult a matron with the inferior title Miss. Yet it is not always easy to know the facts... Now, clearly, what is needed is a more comprehensive term which does homage to the sex without expressing any views as to their domestic situation, and what could be simpler or more logical than the retention of what the two doubtful terms have in common. The abbreviation Ms is simple, it is easy to write, and the person concerned can translate it properly according to circumstances. For oral use it might be rendered as "Mizz," which would be a close parallel to the practice long universal in many bucolic regions, where a slurred Mis' does duty for Miss and Mrs alike.

The term was again suggested as a convenience to writers of business letters by publications including the Bulletin of the American Business Writing Association (1951) and The Simplified Letter, issued by the National Office Management Association (1952).

In 1961, Sheila Michaels attempted to put the term into use when she saw what she thought was a typographical error on the address label of a copy of News & Letters sent to her roommate. Michaels "was looking for a title for a woman who did not 'belong' to a man." She knew the separation of the now common terms Miss and Mrs. had derived from Mistress, but one could not suggest that women use the word "mistress", which had acquired a slang meaning with louche connotations. Her efforts to promote use of a new honorific were at first ignored.

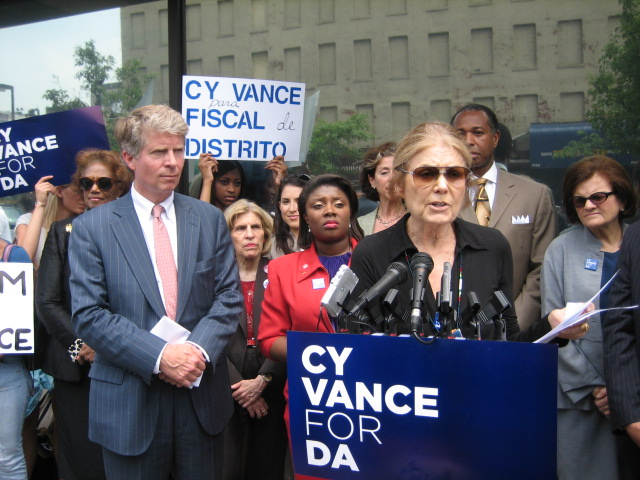
Gloria Steinem, who founded the magazine Ms., popularising the term.

In 1969, during a lull in an interview with The Feminists group on WBAI-FM radio in New York City, Michaels suggested the use of Ms. A friend of Gloria Steinem heard the interview and suggested it as a title for her new magazine. The magazine Ms. debuted on newsstands in January 1972, and its much-publicized name quickly led to widespread usage. In February 1972, the US Government Printing Office approved the use of Ms. in official government documents. In 1976, Marvel Comics introduced a new superhero named Ms. Marvel, billing her as the "first feminist superhero."

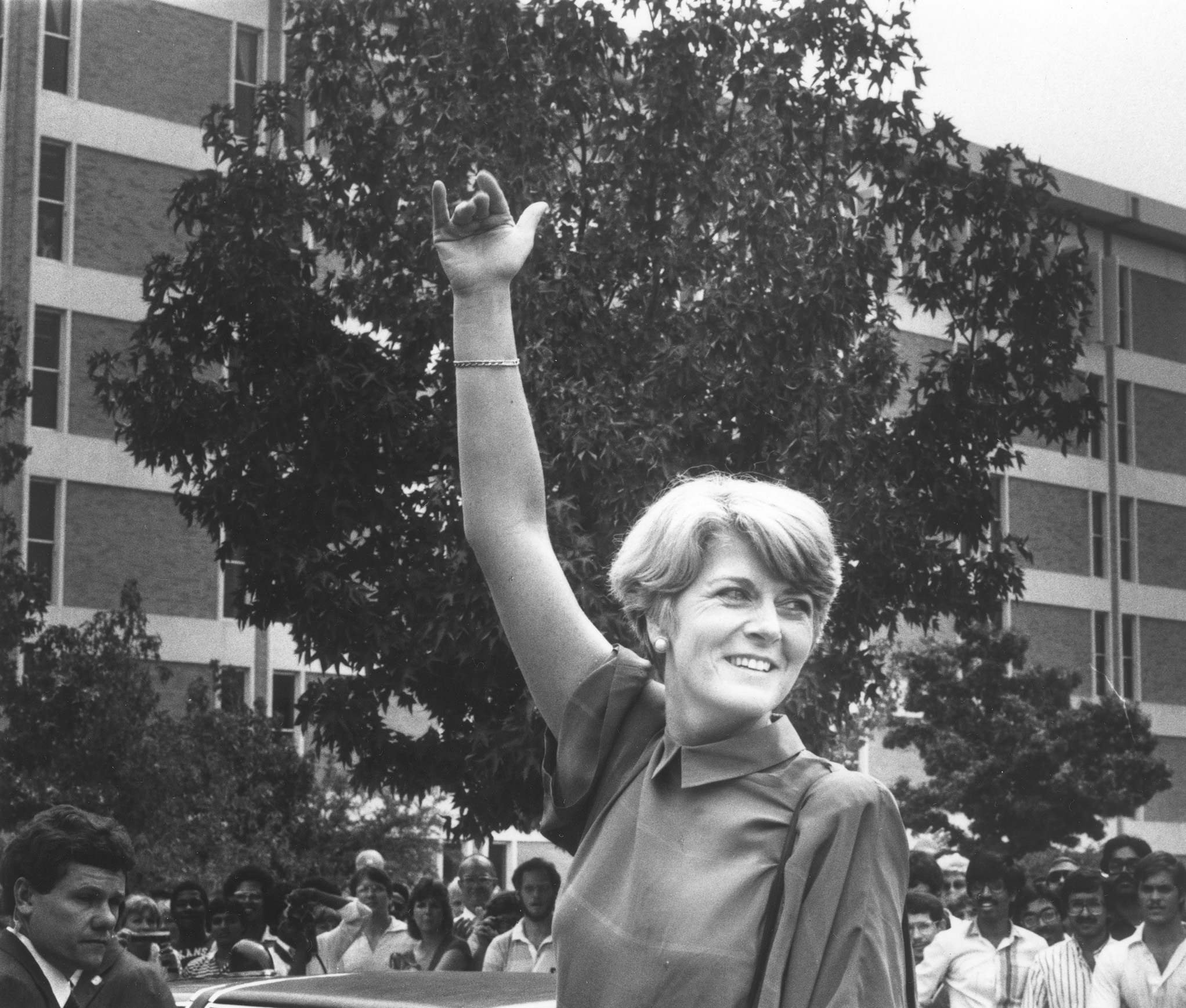
Geraldine Ferraro, whose case encouraged the recognition of "Ms."

Even several public opponents of such usage, including William Safire, were finally convinced that Ms. had earned a place in English by the case of US Congresswoman Geraldine Ferraro. Ferraro, a United States vice-presidential candidate in 1984, was a married woman who, like many women, used her birth surname professionally rather than her husband's (Zaccaro). Safire, though saying "it breaks my heart," admitted in 1984 that it would be equally incorrect to call her "Miss Ferraro" (as she was married) or "Mrs. Ferraro" (as her husband was not "Mr. Ferraro")—and that calling her "Mrs. Zaccaro" would confuse the reader.

== Usage ==
The Daily Telegraph states in its style guide that Ms should only be used if a subject requests it herself and it "should not be used merely because we do not know whether the woman is Mrs or Miss". The Guardian, which restricts its use of honorific titles to leading articles, states in its style guide: "use Ms for women ... unless they have expressed a preference for Miss or Mrs". A BBC Academy style guide states, "In choosing between Miss, Mrs and Ms, try to find out what the person herself uses, and stick to that." The New York Times embraces the use of all three: Mrs., Miss, and Ms., and will follow the individual's preferences.

The default use of Ms., especially for business purposes, is championed by some American sources, including Judith Martin (a.k.a. Miss Manners). Concerning business, the Emily Post Institute states, "Ms. is the default form of address, unless you know positively that a woman wishes to be addressed as Mrs." The American Heritage Book of English Usage states, "Using Ms. obviates the need for the guesswork involved in figuring out whether to address someone as Mrs. or Miss: you can't go wrong with Ms. Whether the woman you are addressing is married or unmarried, has changed her name or not, Ms. is always correct."

== Criticism ==
In the past, some British etiquette writers and famous figures have not supported the use of Ms, including Charles Kidd, the editor of Debrett's Peerage and Baronetage, who claimed the usage is "not very helpful" and that he had been "brought up to address a married woman as Mrs John Smith, for example". However, he also added that "If someone does want to be called Ms then that's fine." but also stated that he had never been asked to change someone's form of address from Miss or Mrs to Ms. Debrett's itself, concerning the case of a married woman who chooses not to take her husband's name, states, "The ugly-sounding Ms is problematic. Although many women have assumed this bland epithet, it remains incorrect to use it when addressing a social letter." The former British Conservative Party Member of Parliament (MP) Ann Widdecombe has stated, "I can't see the point of Ms and I don't see it as an issue", whilst author and journalist Jessica Fellowes described in 2010 the title Ms as "ghastly". Back in 2010 the King's English Society criticised the use of Ms as "an abbreviation that is not short for anything", describing it as a "linguistic misfit [that] came about because certain women suddenly became sensitive about revealing their marital status".
