= Japanese honorifics =

Polite forms of address in Japanese

The Japanese language makes use of a system of honorific speech, called keishō (敬称), which includes very honorific suffixes and prefixes when talking, or referring, to others in a conversation. Suffixes are often gender-specific at the end of names, while prefixes are attached to the beginning of many nouns. Honorific affixes also indicate the speaker's social status and their relationship with the listener, and are often used alongside other components of Japanese honorific speech.

Honorific suffixes are generally used when referring to the person someone is talking to or about, but not when referring to oneself. The omission of affixes indicates that the speaker has known the addressee for a while, or that the listener joined the company or school at the same time or later.

== Common honorifics ==
The most common honorifics include:

Honorific	Approximate English equivalent	Used for
San (さん)	Mr. / Ms.	Workers in a company will often address and refer to their superiors using -san. Relative strangers will address each other using -san. Signals respect.
Sama (様, さま)	Sir / Ma'am; Dear customer (o-kyaku-sama); Ladies and Gentlemen (mina-sama); Your Honor (judges); Your Lordship/Your Ladyship (judges of higher courts); Your Grace / Your Reverence / Your Eminence / Your Holiness (religious authorities); Your Omnipotence (deities)	Indicates deep respect for deities, honored guests or esteemed clients, authorities or superior adults.
Kun (君, くん)		A term of endearment. Used by school teachers addressing their students, or by older co-workers to younger men.
Chan (ちゃん)	Little or Dear	A term of endearment. Most frequently used for girls and small children, close friends, or lovers. Occasionally may be used to refer to a boy if that is his nickname. It is also used in fond terms of address for one's grandmother (Obā-chan) and grandfather (Ojī-chan).
Tan (たん)	Lil	Babies, moe anthropomorphisms
Senpai (先輩)	Senior	Senior colleague and student or classmate
Sensei (先生)	Teacher / Master (in the sense of "master and disciple") / Doctor / Professor	Used to refer to teachers as well as people who are experts in their respective fields, whether doctors, artists or lawyers.
Hakase (博士)	Doctor or PhD	Persons with very high academic expertise
Heika (陛下)	Your Majesty	Emperor, Empress, Empress Dowager or Grand Empress Dowager
Denka (殿下)	Your Imperial Highness	Princes and princesses of the Japanese Imperial Family
Kakka (閣下)	Your Excellency	Used to address non-royal heads of state and government and other high-ranking government officials (ambassadors, cabinet ministers, and other high officials such as the United Nations Secretary-General or generals in an army).

=== San ===
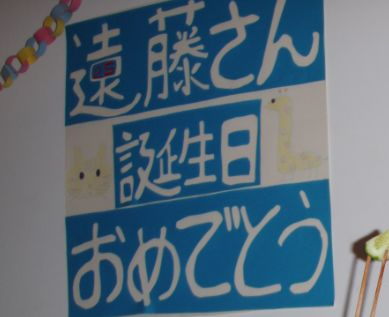
Endō-san tanjōbi omedetō (Happy Birthday, Mr. Endō)

San (さん), sometimes pronounced han (はん) in Kansai dialect, is the most commonplace honorific and is a title of respect typically used between equals of any age. Although the closest analog in English are the honorifics "Mr.", "Miss", "Ms.", or "Mrs.", -san is almost universally added to a person's name; -san can be used in formal and informal contexts, regardless of the person's gender. It is also commonly used to convert common nouns into proper ones, as discussed below.

San may be used in combination with workplace nouns, so a bookseller might be addressed or referred to as hon'ya-san ("bookstore" + san) and a butcher as nikuya-san ("butcher's shop" + san).

San is sometimes used with company names. For example, the offices or shop of a company called Kojima Denki might be referred to as "Kojima Denki-san" by another nearby company. This may be seen on small maps often used in phone books and business cards in Japan, where the names of surrounding companies are written using -san.

San can be attached to the names of animals or even for cooking; "fish" can be referred to as sakana-san, but both would be considered childish (akin to "Mr. Fish" or "Mr. Fishy" in English) and would be avoided in formal speech. When referring to their spouse as a third party in a conversation, married people often refer to them with -san.

Due to -san being gender-neutral and commonly used, it can refer to any stranger or acquaintance whom one does not see as a friend. However, it may not be appropriate when using it on someone close or when it is clear that other honorifics should be used.

=== Sama ===
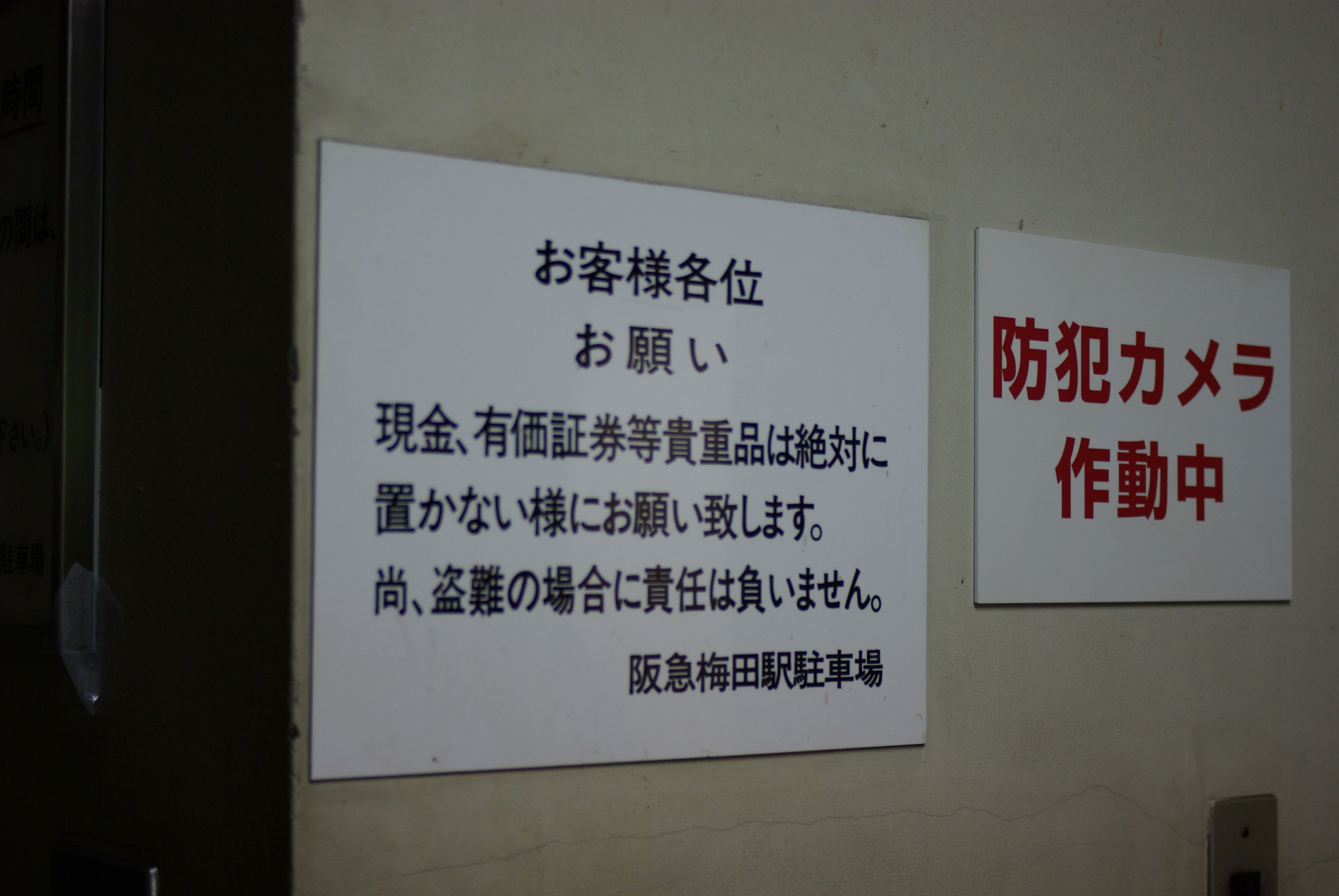
A polite notice to okyaku-sama (customers)

Sama (様, さま) is a more respectful version for individuals of a higher rank than oneself. Appropriate usages include divine entities, guests or customers (such as a sports venue announcer addressing members of the audience), and sometimes towards people one greatly admires. It is the root word for -san. Deities such as native Shinto kami and Jesus Christ are referred to as kami-sama, meaning "Revered spirit-sama". When used to refer to oneself, -sama expresses extreme arrogance (or self-effacing irony), as in praising oneself to be of a higher rank, as with ore-sama (俺様; "my esteemed self").

Sama customarily follows the addressee's name on all formal correspondence and postal services where the addressee is, or is interpreted as, a customer.

Sama also appears in such set phrases as omachidō sama ("thank you for waiting"), gochisō sama ("thank you for the meal"), or otsukare sama ("thank you for a good job").

=== Kun ===
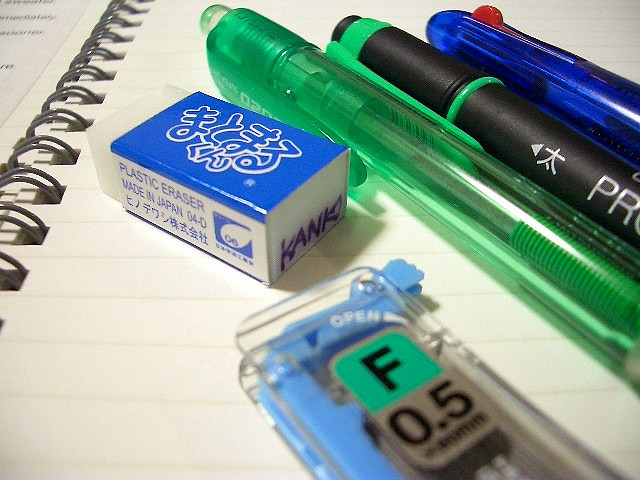
Matomaru-kun (まとまるくん) on an eraser

Kun (君) is generally used by people of senior status addressing or referring to those of junior status, or it can be used when referring to men in general, male children or male teenagers, or among male friends. It can be used by men or women when addressing a man to whom they are emotionally attached, or whom they have known for a long time. Although it may seem rude in workplaces, the suffix is also used by seniors when referring to juniors in both academic situations and workplaces, more typically when the two people are associated.

Although -kun is generally used for boys, it is not a hard rule. For example, -kun can be used to name a close personal friend or family member of any gender. In business settings, young female employees are addressed as -kun by older men of senior status. It can be used by male teachers addressing their female students.

Kun can mean different things depending on gender. Kun for women is a more respectful honorific than -chan, implying childlike cuteness. Kun is not only used to address females formally; it can also be used for a very close friend or family member. Calling a woman -kun is not insulting and can also mean that the person is respected, although that is not the normal implication. Rarely, sisters with the same name, such as "Miku", may be differentiated by calling one "Miku-chan" and the other "Miku-san" or "-sama", and on some occasions,"-kun". -Chan and -kun occasionally mean similar things. The general use of -kun for females implies respectful endearment and that the person being referred to is sweet and kind.

In the National Diet (Legislature), the Speaker of the House uses -kun when addressing Diet members and ministers. An exception was when Takako Doi was the Speaker of the lower house, where she used the title -san.

=== Chan ===
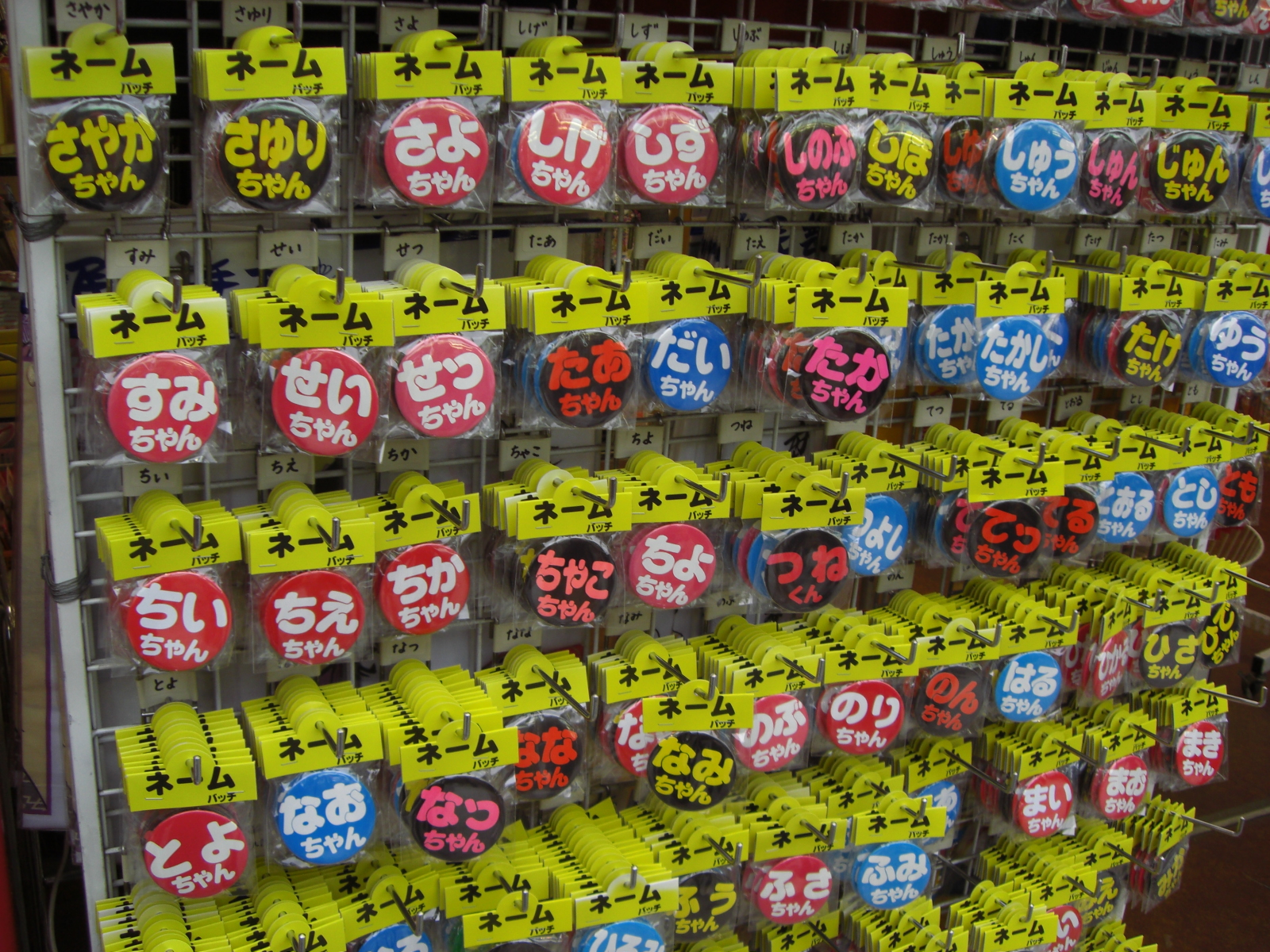
Badges for sale bearing names suffixed with -chan

Chan (ちゃん) expresses that the speaker finds a person endearing. In general, -chan is used for young children, close friends, babies, grandparents and sometimes female adolescents. It may also be used towards cute animals, lovers, or youthful women. Chan is never used for strangers or people one has just met.

Although traditionally, honorifics are not applied to oneself, some people adopt the childlike affectation of referring to themselves in the third person using -chan (childlike because it suggests that one has not learned to distinguish between names used for oneself and names used by others). For example, a young girl named Kanako might call herself Kanako-chan rather than the first-person pronoun.

=== Tan ===
Tan (たん) is intended as an even cuter or affectionate variant of -chan. It evokes a small child's mispronunciation of that form of address, or baby talk – similar to how, for example, a speaker of English might use "widdle" instead of "little" when speaking to a baby. Moe anthropomorphisms are often labeled as -tan, e.g., the commercial mascot Habanero-tan, the manga figure Afghanis-tan, the OS-tans representing operating systems or the unofficial Wikipedia mascot Wikipe-tan. A more notorious use of the honorific was for the murderer Nevada-tan.

=== Bō ===
Bō (坊, ぼう) also expresses endearment. Like -chan, it can be used for young children but exclusively for boys instead of girls. See diminutive and hypocorism for more info on this linguistic phenomenon.

=== Senpai and kōhai ===
Senpai (先輩, せんぱい; "senior") is used to address or refer to one's older or more senior colleagues/students in a school, workplace, dojo, or sports club. Junior members of a group are referred to as kōhai (後輩, こうはい; "junior"), but never addressed as such. Teachers are not senpai, but sensei.

=== Sensei and hakase ===
Sensei (先生; lit. "born earlier") is used to refer to or address teachers, doctors, politicians, lawyers, and other authority figures. It is used to show respect to someone who has achieved mastery in an art form or some other skill, such as accomplished novelists, musicians, artists, and martial artists. In Japanese martial arts, sensei typically refers to someone who is the head of a dojo. As with senpai, sensei can be used not only as a suffix but also as a stand-alone title. Hakase (博士; lit. "Doctor" or "PhD") is sometimes used when addressing holders of a doctoral degree.

=== Shi ===
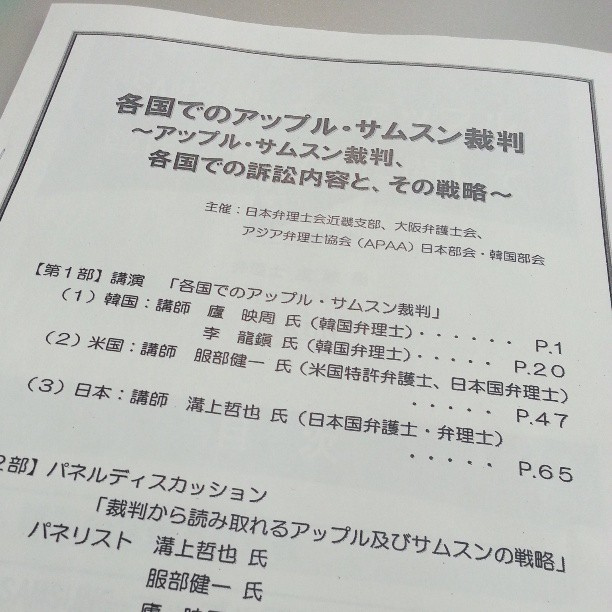
Shi

Shi (氏) is used in formal writing and sometimes in very formal speech for referring to a person who is unfamiliar to the speaker, typically a person known through publications whom the speaker has never actually met. For example, the -shi title is common in the speech of newsreaders. It is preferred in legal documents, academic journals, and other formal written styles. Once a person's name has been used with -shi, the person can be referred to with shi alone, without the name, as long as only one person is being referred to.

=== O- and go- prefix ===
O- (お-) and go- (ご-) are honorific prefixes used to exalt nouns. They can be applied to things like a garden (お庭, oniwa) or to people in conjunction with a suffix, like a doctor (お医者さん, oishasan). O- is used for words with Japanese roots, while go- is used for words with Chinese roots, although exceptions such as ojōsan (お嬢さん), oishasan above, okyakusama (お客様) where o- is used with Chinese words still occur. They are only ever used in the second or third person, and when applied to an object indicate respect for the owner of the object rather than the object itself. For example, one would refer to the parents of another as goryōshin (ご両親) while their own parents would be ryōshin (両親).

=== Pitch accent ===
Honorifics do not tend to alter the pitch accent of the names they suffix (中村 [nä̀.kä́.mɯ̈́.ɾä́] → 中村さん [nä̀.kä́.mɯ̈́.ɾä́.sä́ɴ́]; 山下 [jä̀.mä́.ɕi̥.tä̀] → 山下君 [jä̀.mä́.ɕi̥.tä̀.kɯ̈̀ɴ̀]). Notably, -shi (氏) adds an accent to an unaccented name (中村 [nä̀.kä́.mɯ̈́.ɾä́] → 中村氏 [nä̀.kä́.mɯ̈́.ɾä́.ɕì]; 山下 [jä̀.mä́.ɕi̥.tä̀] → 山下氏 [jä̀.mä́.ɕi̥.tä̀.ɕì]). Note that this usage, which preserves the accentual patterns of names, is distinct from the original meaning of -shi which was used for feudal clans and which overrides the patterns of names. Thus, if 徳川氏 is pronounced [tò̞.kɯ̈́.ɡä̀.β̞ä̀.ɕì] (the name's accent is preserved), it means "Lord Tokugawa"; but if it is pronounced [tò̞.kɯ̈́.ɡä́.β̞ä́.ɕì] (the name's accent is overridden), it means "the Tokugawa clan".

== Usage ==
Although honorifics are not essential to the grammar of Japanese, they are a fundamental part of its sociolinguistics, and their proper use is deemed essential to proficient and appropriate speech.

The use of honorifics is closely related to Japanese social structures and hierarchies. For example, a 1986 study on the notion that Japanese women spoke more politely than men examined each sex's use of honorifics found that while women spoke more politely on average than men, both sexes used the same level of politeness in the same relative situation. Thus, the difference in politeness was a result of the average social station of women versus men as opposed to an inherent characteristic. Usage in this respect has changed over time as well. A 2012 study from Kobe Shoin Women's University found that the use of honorific suffixes and other polite speech markers have increased significantly over time, while age, sex, and other social variables have become less significant. The paper concluded that honorifics have shifted from a basis in power dynamics to one of personal distance.

They can be applied to either the first or last name depending on which is given. In situations where both the first and last names are spoken, the suffix is attached to whichever comes last in the word order. Japanese names traditionally follow the Eastern name order.

An honorific is generally used when referring to the person one is talking to (one's interlocutor), or when referring to an unrelated third party in speech. However, it is dropped by some superiors when referring to one's in-group or informal writing. It is never used to refer to oneself, except for dramatic effect or some exceptional cases.

Usually, when talking to one's interlocutor, it would be disconnected or even rude to refer to that person as 'you' if you know their name. It would be expected for you to refer to them by their name and respective honorifics.

Dropping the honorific suffix when referring to one's interlocutor, which is known as to yobisute (呼び捨て), implies a high degree of intimacy and is generally reserved for one's spouse, younger family members, social inferiors (as in a teacher addressing students in traditional arts), close friends and confidants. Within sports teams or among classmates, where the interlocutors approximately are of the same age or seniority, it can be acceptable to use family names without honorifics. Some people of the younger generation, roughly born since 1970, prefer to be referred to without an honorific. However, dropping honorifics is a sign of informality even with casual acquaintances.

When referring to a third person, honorifics are used except when referring to one's family members while talking to a non-family member or when referring to a member of one's company while talking to a customer or someone from another company—this is the uchi–soto (in-group / out-group) distinction. Honorifics are not used to refer to oneself, except when trying to be arrogant (ore-sama), to be cute (-chan), or sometimes when talking to young children to teach them how to address the speaker.

Use of honorifics is correlated with other forms of honorific speech in Japanese, such as the use of the polite form (-masu, desu) versus the plain form—that is, using the plain form with a polite honorific (-san, -sama) can be jarring.

While these honorifics are solely used on proper nouns, these suffixes can turn common nouns into appropriate nouns when attached to the end of them. This can be seen in words such as neko-chan (猫ちゃん) which turns the common noun neko (cat) into a proper noun that would refer solely to that particular cat while adding the honorific -chan can also mean cute.

== Translation ==
When translating honorific suffixes into English, separate pronouns or adjectives must be used to convey characteristics to the person they are referencing. While some honorifics such as -san are very frequently used due to their gender neutrality and straightforward definition of polite unfamiliarity, other honorifics such as -chan or -kun are more specific as to the context in which they must be used as well as the implications they give off when attached to a person's name. These implications can only be translated into English using adjectives or adjective word phrases.

== Other titles ==
=== Occupation-related titles ===
It is common to use a job title after someone's name, instead of using a general honorific. For example, an athlete (選手, senshu) named Ichiro might be referred to as "Ichiro-senshu" rather than "Ichiro-san", and a master carpenter (棟梁, tōryō) named Suzuki might be referred to as "Suzuki-tōryō" rather than "Suzuki-san".

In a business setting, it is common to refer to people using their rank, especially for positions of authority, such as department chief (部長, buchō) or company president (社長, shachō). Within one's own company or when speaking of another company, title + san is used, so a president is Shachō-san. When speaking of one's own company to a customer or another company, the title is used by itself or attached to a name, so a department chief named Suzuki is referred to as Buchō or Suzuki-buchō.

However, when referring to oneself, the title is used indirectly, as using it directly is perceived as arrogant. Thus, a department chief named Suzuki will introduce themselves as 部長の鈴木 buchō no Suzuki ("Suzuki, the department chief"), rather than ×鈴木部長 *Suzuki-buchō ("Department Chief Suzuki").

=== For criminals and the accused ===
Convicted and suspected criminals were once referred to without any title. Still, now an effort is made to distinguish between suspects (容疑者, yōgisha), defendants (被告, hikoku), and convicts (受刑者, jukeisha), so as not to presume guilt before anything has been proven. These titles can be used by themselves or attached to names.

Although "suspect" and "defendant" began as neutral descriptions, they have become derogatory over time. When actor and musician Gorō Inagaki was arrested for a traffic accident in 2001, some media referred to him with the newly made title menbā (メンバー), originating from the English word "member", to avoid the use of yōgisha (容疑者, suspect). But in addition to being criticized as an unnatural term, this title also became derogatory almost instantly—an example of euphemism treadmill.

Criminals who are sentenced to death for serious crimes such as murder, treason, etc. are referred to as shikeishū (死刑囚).

=== For companies ===
There are several different words for "our company" and "your company". "Our company" can be expressed with the humble heisha (弊社; "clumsy/poor company") or the neutral jisha (自社; "our own company"), and "your company" can be expressed with the honorific kisha (貴社; "noble company", used in writing) or onsha (御社; "honorable company", used in speech). Additionally, the neutral tōsha (当社; "this company") can refer to either the speaker's or the listener's company. All of these titles are used by themselves, not attached to names.

When mentioning a company's name, it is considered important to include its status depending on whether it is incorporated (株式会社, kabushiki-gaisha) or limited (有限会社, yūgen-gaisha). These are often abbreviated as 株 and 有, respectively.

=== Imperial styles ===
Heika (陛下), lit. "below the steps [of the throne]", an equivalent to "Majesty", is the most formal style of nobility in Japan, and is reserved only for the Emperor, Empress, Empress Dowager or Grand Empress Dowager. All other members of the Imperial Family are styled Denka (殿下), the equivalent of "Imperial Highness". Although the monarch of Japan is an emperor, he is not usually styled as "Imperial Majesty"; however, other members of the imperial family are customarily styled "His/Her Imperial Highness" while the Emperor's style in English is simply "His Majesty".

Kōi was an ancient title for Empress Consort or Empress Dowager. Use during the Heian period is exemplified for example for the character Kiritsubo Consort (桐壺更衣, Kiritsubo no Kōi) in The Tale of Genji. The title Kōi later gave way for Kōgō (皇后) for the empress consort.

The use of Heika is also customarily used when referring to foreign monarchs in Japanese, regardless of whether they are kings, queens, or emperors. For instance, the British sovereign may be referred to as Eikoku Oukoku no Chāruzu Sansei Heika (英国王国のチャールズ3世陛下, "His Majesty King Charles III of the United Kingdom"). This usage reflects a practice of applying equivalent honorific forms to foreign royalty in diplomatic and formal contexts.

=== Dono / tono ===
Tono (殿), pronounced -dono (どの) when attached to a name, roughly means "lord" or "master". It does not imply noble status, rather it is akin to "milord" or French "monseigneur" or Portuguese/Spanish/Italian "don". This term lies below -sama in level of respect. This title is not commonly used in daily conversation, but it is still used in some types of written business correspondence, as well as on certificates and awards, and in tea ceremonies. It is also used to indicate that the person referred to has the same (high) rank as the referrer, yet commands respect from the speaker.

=== No kimi ===
No kimi (の君) is another suffix coming from Japanese history. It was used to denominate lords and ladies in the court, especially during the Heian period. The most famous example is the Prince Hikaru Genji, protagonist of The Tale of Genji who was called Hikaru no kimi (光の君). Nowadays, this suffix can be used as a metaphor for someone who behaves like a prince or princess from ancient times, but its use is very rare. Its main usage remains in historical dramas.

This suffix also appears when addressing lovers in letters from a man to a woman, as in Murasaki no kimi ("My beloved Ms. Murasaki").

=== Ue ===
Ue (上) literally means "above", and denotes a high level of respect. While its use is no longer common, it is still seen in constructions like chichi-ue (父上), haha-ue (母上) and ane-ue (姉上), reverent terms for "father", "mother" and "older sister" respectively. Receipts that do not require specification of the payer's name are often filled in with ue-sama.

=== Martial arts titles ===
Japanese martial arts often use sensei (先生) to address teachers. Junior and senior students (先輩 and 後輩) are categorized separately based on experience level. In aikidō and some systems of karate, O-Sensei (大先生) is the title of the (deceased) head of the style. The founder of Aikido, Morihei Ueshiba is most often referred to this way by practitioners of that art. The O- prefix itself, translating roughly as "great[er]" or "major", is also an honorific.

Various titles are also employed to refer to senior instructors, such as shidōin (指導員). Which titles are used depends on the particular licensing organization.

==== Shōgō ====
Shōgō (称号; "title", "name", "degree") are martial arts titles developed by the Dai Nippon Butoku Kai, the Kokusai Budoin, and the International Martial Arts Federation Europe. Many organizations in Japan award such titles upon a sincere study and dedication of Japanese martial arts. The below mentioned titles are awarded after observing a person's martial arts skills, their ability of teaching and understanding of martial arts and the most importantly as a role model and the perfection of one's character.

- Renshi (錬士): Polished Instructor (skilled person or expert teacher). Awarded to 4th dan and above.
- Kyōshi (教士) refers to an advanced teacher (senior teacher/expert). Awarded to 6th dan and above.
- Hanshi (範士) refers to a senior expert considered a "teacher of teachers". This title is used by many different arts for the top few instructors of that style, and is sometimes translated "Grand Master". Awarded to 8th dan and above.
- Meijin (名人): awarded by a special board of examiners.

==== Other martial arts titles ====
- Oyakata (親方), master, especially a sumo coach. The literal sense is of someone in loco parentis. Also used by the yakuza. In ancient times, it was also used by samurai to address the daimyō they serve, as he was Oyakata-sama, the clan's don.
- Shihan (師範), merely means chief instructor; unlike the titles above, it is not related to grade.
- Shidōin (指導員), intermediate instructor, also unrelated to grade.
- Shishō (師匠), another title used for martial arts instructors.
- Zeki (関; lit. "barrier"), used for sumo wrestlers in the top two divisions (sekitori).

Levels of black belts are occasionally used as martial arts titles:

- Shodan – 1st dan
- Nidan – 2nd dan
- Sandan – 3rd dan
- Yondan – 4th dan
- Godan – 5th dan
- Rokudan – 6th dan
- Shichidan or Nanadan – 7th dan
- Hachidan – 8th dan
- Kudan – 9th dan
- Jūdan – 10th dan

=== Religion ===
- Shinpu (神父), Orthodox or Catholic priest (lit. Godfather). A Catholic priest (司祭, shisai; lit. minister of worship) receives this title.
- Bokushi (牧師), Protestant minister. This title is given to a Protestant minister (司祭, shisai).

== Euphonic suffixes and wordplay ==
In informal speech, some Japanese people may use contrived suffixes in place of normal honorifics. This is essentially a form of wordplay, with suffixes being chosen for their sound, or for friendly or scornful connotations. Although the range of such suffixes that might be coined is limitless, some have gained such widespread usage that the boundary between established honorifics and wordplay has become a little blurred. Examples of such suffixes include variations on -chan (see below), -bee (scornful), and -rin (friendly). Unlike a proper honorific, use of such suffixes is governed largely by how they sound in conjunction with a particular name, and on the effect the speaker is trying to achieve.

=== Baby talk variations ===
Some honorifics have baby talk versions—mispronunciations stereotypically associated with small children and cuteness, and more frequently used in popular entertainment than in everyday speech. The baby talk version of -sama is -chama (ちゃま).

There are even baby talk versions of baby talk versions. Chan can be changed to -tan (たん), and less often, -chama (ちゃま) to -tama (たま).

== Familial honorifics ==
Words for family members have two different forms in Japanese. When referring to one's own family members while speaking to a non-family-member, neutral, descriptive nouns are used, such as haha (母) for "mother" and ani (兄) for "older brother". Honorific forms are used when addressing one's own family members or addressing or referring to someone else's family members. Using the suffix -san, as is most common, "mother" becomes okāsan (お母さん) and "older brother" becomes oniisan (お兄さん). The honorifics -chan and -sama may also be used instead of -san, to express a higher level of closeness or reverence, respectively.

The general rule is that a younger family member (e.g., a young brother) addresses an older family member (e.g., a big sister) using an honorific form, while the more senior family member calls the younger one only by name.

The honorific forms are:

- O-tōsan (お-父さん): father. The descriptive noun is chichi (父).
  - Ojisan (叔父さん／小父さん／伯父さん): uncle, or also middle-aged gentleman.
  - O-jiisan (お-祖父さん／御爺さん／お-爺さん／御祖父さん): grandfather, or also male senior-citizen.
- O-kāsan (お-母さん): mother. The descriptive noun is haha (母).
  - Obasan (伯母さん／小母さん／叔母さん): aunt, or also middle-aged lady.
  - O-bāsan (お-祖母さん／御-祖母さん／御-婆さん／お-婆さん): grandmother, or also female senior-citizen.
- O-niisan (お-兄さん): big brother, or also a young gentleman. The descriptive noun is ani (兄).
  - Otouto (おとうと): little brother.
- O-nēsan (お-姉さん): big sister, or also a young lady. The descriptive noun is ane (姉).
  - Imouto (妹): little sister.

The initial o- (お-) prefix in those nouns spelled as such is itself an honorific prefix. In more casual situations the speaker may omit this prefix but keep the suffix.

- Niichan (兄ちゃん) or Niisan (兄さん): when a child addresses their elder brother.
- Nēchan (姉ちゃん) or Nēsan (姉さん): when a child addresses their elder sister.
- Kāsan (母さん): when a man addresses his wife (the mother of their children).
- Tōsan (父さん): when a woman addresses her husband (the father of their children).
- Bāchan (祖母ちゃん): when children address their grandmother.
- Jiichan (祖父ちゃん): when children address their grandfather.
- Kyoudai (兄弟): siblings, when they are referring to their relationship.

== See also ==
- Aizuchi
- Honorific speech in Japanese
- Etiquette in Japan
- Japanese pronouns
- Zen ranks and hierarchy

=== Other languages ===
- T–V distinction (politeness differences more generally)
- Chinese honorifics
- Chinese titles
- Korean honorifics

== Bibliography ==
- Hijirida, Kyoko; Sohn, Ho-min (1986). "Cross-Cultural Patterns of Honorifics and Sociolinguistic Sensitivity to Honorific Variables: Evidence from English, Japanese, and Korean". Paper in Linguistics. 19 (3). Taylor & Francis: 365–401. doi:10.1080/08351818609389264.
- Nakazato, Yuji (1997). An honorific index for Japanese (PhD). Georgetown University. S2CID 152383846. ProQuest 304341222.
- Obana, Yasuko (1991). "A Comparison of Honorifics in Japanese and English Languages". Japanese Studies. 11 (3). Taylor & Francis: 52–61. doi:10.1080/10371399108521974.
- Shibamoto-Smith, Janet S. (2011). "Honorifics, "politeness," and power in Japanese political debate". Journal of Pragmatics. 43 (15): 3707–3719. doi:10.1016/j.pragma.2011.09.003.
