= ISIS-chan =

Fictional manga character

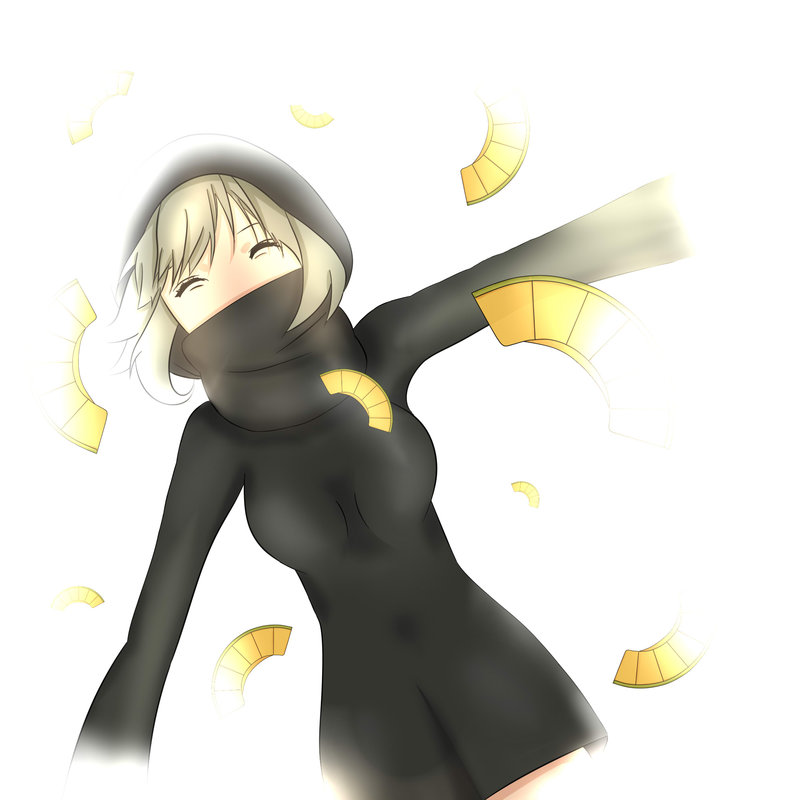
ISIS-chan on a white background

ISIS-chan (ISIS(アイシス)ちゃん, Aishisuchan) is a fictional manga character that originated on the Japanese internet textboard 2channel and was created in 2015 after a series of incidents in which Japanese nationals were kidnapped and beheaded by ISIS. The character is portrayed as a moe-style girl.

== Overview ==
ISIS-chan was originally conceived by users of 2channel as a response to the propaganda of the Islamic terrorism group ISIS. The character is a moe anthropomorphism of ISIS and soon became a meme across some Japanese social media.

Their intentions were to flood the web with ISIS-chan's images to make the character rank highly in Google's search engine results, the goal being that an internet search for ISIS would come up with the moe character instead of militant propaganda sites. The campaign has become a part of the social media war that the US and the UK have already launched against ISIS.

ISIS-chan received an UTAU voice bank in December 2015.

== See also ==
- Afghanis-tan
- Hinomoto Oniko
- Corona-chan
- Ebola-chan
