= 日本鬼子 =

日本鬼子 (lit. 'Japanese devil') may refer to:

- Riben guizi, a Chinese pejorative for Japanese people
- Hinomoto Oniko, a Japanese moe character based on the slur
- Japanese Devils, a Japanese documentary about the war crimes committed by the Imperial Japanese Army
