= Nick Kapur =

American historian of Japan

- Occupation: Historian

Academic background
- Education: Stanford University (MA); Harvard University (PhD)

Academic work
- Discipline: History
- Sub-discipline: History of Japan, United States–Japan relations
- Institutions: Rutgers University–Camden
- Notable works: Japan at the Crossroads: Conflict and Compromise after Anpo (2018)

Nick Kapur is an American historian of modern Japan and an associate professor of history at Rutgers University–Camden. His research focuses on modern Japanese political and cultural history, social movements, and United States–Japan relations. He is the author of the book Japan at the Crossroads: Conflict and Compromise after Anpo (2018), a widely cited study of the 1960 Anpo protests in Japan.

== Academic career ==
Kapur received his Ph.D. in Japanese history from Harvard University, where he studied under historians Akira Iriye and Andrew Gordon. Kapur joined the faculty of Rutgers University–Camden in 2014 as a historian specializing in Japanese, East Asian, and global history.

In addition to traditional scholarship, Kapur has participated in digital humanities projects, including serving as project manager for the Japan Disasters Digital Archive and devising educational interactive simulations of Japan's Sengoku period. Kapur has also been involved in organizing scholarly networks in the field of Japanese history, including playing a leading role in the founding of the Modern Japan History Association.

Kapur is frequently interviewed by mainstream media outlets as an expert on postwar Japanese history and politics. He has also gained mainstream media attention for his public engagement on social media, such as a viral thread on Chinese nicknames for NBA players, or a viral thread on a mythical "killing stone" in Japan.

== Awards and fellowships ==
- Japan Foundation Fellowship, 2025
- Mike and Maureen Mansfield U.S.-Japan Network for the Future Fellowship, 2022-2024
- Fulbright Fellowship, 2008-2009

== Works ==
=== Books ===
- Kapur, Nick (2018). Japan at the Crossroads: Conflict and Compromise after Anpo. Cambridge, Massachusetts: Harvard University Press. ISBN 9780674988484.

=== Selected articles ===
- Kapur, Nick (2025). "The Invention of the Kamikaze: Dissent and Resistance in the Japanese Military". The Journal of Military History.
- Kapur, Nick (2022). "The Japanese Student Movement in the Cold War Crucible, 1945–1972". Asia-Pacific Journal.
- Kapur, Nick (2018). "The Empire Strikes Back? The 1968 Meiji Centennial Celebrations and the Revival of Japanese Nationalism". Japanese Studies.

=== Other writing ===
Kapur has also written essays and commentary on Japanese politics and protest movements for public-facing publications and academic commentary forums.

== Reception ==
Japan at the Crossroads: Conflict and Compromise after Anpo has been positively received by historians of modern Japan in leading academic journals and other publications. Reviewers have emphasized the book’s detailed archival research, its clear narrative of the political struggles surrounding the 1960 renewal of the U.S.–Japan Security Treaty, and its broader interpretation of the long-term consequences of the Anpo protests for Japanese politics and culture.
