= Ebola-chan =

2014 Internet meme

Ebola-chan (Japanese: エボラちゃん, romanized: eborachan) is an Internet meme depicting a moe anthropomorphization of the Ebola virus and was popularized on 4chan amid the Western African Ebola epidemic. The first known image of Ebola-chan began on the Japanese social media site, Pixiv, in 2014. A few days after, it was posted 4chan's /pol/ (politically incorrect) thread, who began posting messages praising Ebola-chan. Soon after, 4chan users began spreading the meme to Nairaland, the largest online message board in Nigeria, accompanying images of Ebola-chan with racist messages and associated conspiracy theories. This included claims that Ebola was CIA-made and that white people were performing rituals for Ebola to spread. The meme's spread has been considered racist and has been attributed to increased mistrust between West Africans and medical professionals.

== Background ==
In 2014, the Ebola virus epidemic broke out in West Africa. The first cases of the outbreak were recorded in Guinea in December 2013. Subsequently, the outbreak spread to the neighbouring countries of Liberia and Sierra Leone, with additional outbreaks in Nigeria and Mali. The epidemic would go on to receive widespread, world-wide media coverage, with increased public awareness and concern over the virus and its transmission.

== History ==
The first known image of the "Ebola-chan" meme was originally published on Pixiv on August 4, 2014. On August 7, 2014, Ebola-chan was posted to the /pol/ thread on 4chan. The image was accompanied with a tongue-in-cheek message that would threaten users with death and pain if they did not reply with the phrase "I Love You Ebola-chan." The image began appearing on Reddit, Facebook, and DeviantArt, with users often making comments such as "GOOD LUCK EBOLA-CHAN!" and "HAIL BLOOD-GODDESS! HAIL EBOLA-CHAN!", accompanied with racist messages.

Users on 4chan began uploading the meme to Nairaland, in an effort to "increase tensions between blacks and whites in Africa" by convincing people in West Africa that Ebola was created by the white race, taking advantage of African beliefs in voodoo. These images would include makeshift shrines and allusions to death cults, blood sacrifices, and demon worship. While the initial post was mostly seen as an attempt at 'trolling', many Nigerian users of the site were later convinced that American and European users were performing "magical rituals in order to spread the disease and kill people" and regarded Ebola-chan as a plague goddess. Other threads would promote the conspiracy theory that Ebola was CIA-made and being intentionally spread by the United States. This would expand into users claiming that Ebola doctors were part of the cult and intentionally spreading the illness. In September 2014, 4chan administrators began removing posts of Ebola-chan from the site.

On October 9, 2014, a man walking his dog in East Longmeadow, Massachusetts found an altar containing an image of Ebola-chan. Accompanying this was a carved wooden mask, an unlit candle, Christmas decorations, sheets of paper with incomprehensible writing and symbols, and a bowl of rice mixed with twigs and fake blood. The police investigating the shrine believe it was connected to a recent total lunar eclipse, or a blood moon.

== Description ==
Ebola-chan is an anime anthropomorphization of the Ebola virus. The character has a long pink hair that curls in the characteristic shape of Ebola. Ebola-chan has been described as being caucasian-stylized. Ebola-chan was often depicted wearing a nurse outfit and holding a bloodied skull. Some depictions of the character include small purple demon wings and a happy disposition. Oftentime, the character would be depicted in a sexualized manner, alongside a lesbian partner.

== Reception ==
Ebola-chan has been criticized as racially motivated and a concerted effort to increase black-white tensions. During the height of the outbreak, aid workers reported they faced mistrust and misinformation in affected communities, with many West Africans believing that the disease was the work of 'sorcerers'. The International Business Times and Washington Post would describe Ebola-chan as an exacerbating factor.

Ebola-chan has been compared to the gijinka ISIS-chan, as they were both used to personify controversial topics. In 2020, during the COVID-19 pandemic, 4chan would create Corona-chan, a personification of coronavirus which would also be compared to Ebola-chan.

== In popular culture ==
In 2016, Ebola-chan was added to Yandere Simulator as "Ebola Mode", in which the protagonist can transform into Ebola-chan; she subsequently gains the ability to immediately kill other students just by touching them. This game is still unreleased after years in development.

== See also ==
- Corona-chan, moe anthropomorphization of COVID-19
- ISIS-chan, a later moe anthropomorphization of the Islamic State
