= Wang Junxiu =

Wang Junxiu (王俊秀) is a Chinese internet entrepreneur and opponent of internet censorship. He is credited with helping establish some of China's first blogs and helped cofound "China’s most popular blog-hosting website", Bokee.com, where he is chief executive officer.

Wang opposed China's Green Dam proposal for all computers in the country to be equipped with internet filtering software. In July 2010 his blog and those of other "public opinion leader" were removed from Sohu.com, one of China's most popular web portals. Wang's story was featured in Philip P. Pan's book Out of Mao's Shadow He and Tieng Biao discussed the citizen rights movement in China since 2003 and how it "has opened a new direction in the democracy movement" at 2009 seminar.
