= Nairaland =

Nigerian website

- Website type: Internet forum
- Available in: English
- Headquarters: Lagos, Nigeria
- Area served: Worldwide
- Website: nairaland.com
- IPv6 support: No
- Advertising: Banner ads
- Commercial: Yes
- Registration: Optional (Note: Nairaland can be viewed without an account but registration is required to post, comment or like.)
- Users: 3.0 million registered users (March 2023)
- Launched: April 20, 2005; 21 years ago
- Current status: Active

Nairaland is a Nigerian English-language news website. Founded by Nigerian entrepreneur Seun Osewa on October 20, 2011, it is targeted primarily at Nigerian domestic residents and is the 5th most visited website in Nigeria.

It currently has over 5.9 million users with over 7.3 million topics created to date, and it is estimated that approximately 5% of Nigerian Internet users are registered on Nairaland, compared to Feedcover or Facebook's 11 million Nigerian users, which corresponds to approximately 20% of the local Internet population. Registration is only necessary for posting, commenting or liking posts.

== Incidents ==
=== 2014 4chan prank ===
During the Ebola virus epidemic, trolls from 4chan registered on Nairaland in 2014 to propagate false claims that Americans and Europeans were spreading the Ebola virus in magical rituals through worship of 4chan's "Ebola-chan" meme (an anime personification of the Ebola virus).

=== 2014 down period ===
On June 22, 2014, following a successful hacking attempt, Nairaland went offline briefly. The hackers were able to gain access to, and wipe the contents of, the website's host server and backup. Three days later, it was back online after some data had been recovered from a remote backup. However, user posts and registration between January 10, 2014, and June 22, 2014, was lost. Users with lost accounts were required to re-register.

=== QAnon conspiracy theory ===
In August 2020, The Daily Beast reported that some users on Nairaland were promoting the QAnon conspiracy theory.

=== Ethnic Bigotry ===
Nairaland has faced criticism for hosting content and fostering communities promoting ethnic bigotry. Although the platform has implemented policies against hate speech and discrimination, concerns remain about the prevalence of ethnic slurs, stereotypes, and inflammatory rhetoric targeting various Nigerian ethnic groups. This has led to the erosion of members from Nairaland to other social networks like Facebook, Nelogram and Twitter that have strict rules against abuse and hate speech.

=== 2023 Site host shutdown ===
The Nairaland website was temporarily shut down on the 18th of December, 2023 by its server host.
