= Inori Aizawa =

Mascot character of Internet Explorer

- First appearance: May 13, 2013
- Created by: Waha (Low Zi Rong)
- Voiced by: Valerie Tang

Inori Aizawa (Japanese: 相沢いのり; Chinese: 藍澤祈), also known as Internet Explorer-tan, is a moe anthropomorphism mascot character of the Internet Explorer (IE) web browser, and later Microsoft Edge, created by Microsoft Singapore and designed by Collateral Damage Studios. Inori was created in celebration of Anime Festival Asia 2013, and is featured in a video, a Facebook profile, and a special edition of the browser. Inori was intended as a mascot for IE following the software's falling popularity. The character has received mostly positive reception.

== Character development ==
Inori Aizawa is a personification of Internet Explorer. She was designed by Collateral Damage Studios, who wanted to create their own character after artist and producer Danny Choo posted an image featuring human equivalents of the Safari, Firefox, and Chrome web browsers. However, the initial design was little more than fan art. Though after Collateral Damage Studios jokingly asked Microsoft to "call them", a representative from Microsoft Asia-Pacific approached the company, and Inori was adopted as a mascot for Internet Explorer. As stated by Microsoft, Inori was created by Microsoft Singapore for the Anime Festival Asia 2013 event, and is a part of the local marketing program for anime and Japanese popular culture at AFA 2013, as well as across Asia. However, she does not represent an official mascot for Internet Explorer. At the Festival, Inori was used to draw local attention to the new browser, as well as Windows Phone-powered Nokia phones and tablets. A Microsoft employee has claimed that Inori represents "a new way of looking at" Internet Explorer. The character is voiced by former Sea*A idol and anime song artist Valerie, who also made a cosplay appearance as Inori at Microsoft's marketing launch at AFA2013. Despite being featured on the official Internet Explorer YouTube channel, Microsoft has clarified that Inori Aizawa will not be used in marketing campaigns outside Asia, which includes the United States.

According to Collateral Damage Studios, the artists who created the character, "The concept that we wanted to go for with our IE-tan was 'redemption", referencing the earlier, poorer versions of Internet Explorer. They compared the earlier versions of the browser to "a clumsy girl who tries to do too much. She is klutzy, nerdy ... someone that everyone would love to bully", and thus design elements were incorporated to reflect upon IE's transformation from an "ugly duckling" to a "slick and confident" browser. Regarding the character's name, Collateral Damage Studios commented that they chose "Aizawa" as she comes from the greater Microsoft family of anime personification characters, and "Inori" since "given what she represents, she could definitely use a prayer." An advertisement featuring Inori was uploaded to Internet Explorer's YouTube channel for the Anime Festival Asia event. Microsoft had previously used similar anime characters in its marketing in Asia. This includes Hikaru Aizawa, whom Microsoft Taiwan has used to market Microsoft Silverlight since 2010, Nanami Madobe, the mascot of Windows 7, as well as Madobe Ai and Madobe Yuu, the mascots of Windows 8. To date, over 10 original characters have been used. However, all of these characters were inspired by the original OS-tans, personified operating systems that had their origins on Futaba Channel. Apart from the video, there is also a Facebook page devoted to the character, including a post on Inori's backstory, which, along with the video, is a metaphor for the development and evolution of Internet Explorer. Additionally, Inori features in a special edition of the latest version of the browser. Microsoft hopes that Inori may cause anime fans to return to the browser, due to Internet Explorer's declining popularity as well as the emergence of other browsers such as Google Chrome and Mozilla Firefox.

== Reception ==
Cnet's Bonnie Burton reviewed Inori positively, saying "she's is a sassy girl who fights robots, dresses like a sexy otaku girl, and pets her cat while surfing the Net. She's the kind of girl you want hanging around your computer", and compared her to Clippy, the "annoying Office Assistant" attached to earlier versions of Microsoft Office. They also claimed that "she represents a shift in thinking about what IE's image could become", and wished that her role could eventually be expanded. The Verge called the Inori Aizawa video Microsoft's "best ad yet", and added "In the end, this is anime for the sake of anime, and it's fun based on that alone. It may not inspire any users to stow Chrome in favor of IE, but it's certainly worth the watch." They also compared it positively to earlier Microsoft ad campaigns. They also claimed "No character has been quite like Inori Aizawa, though. Introduced to the world in a commercial titled "Internet Explorer: The Anime", Inori is made to entice the masses, rather than developers or enthusiasts, to try out Microsoft's steadily improving browser." Digital Journal labelled the Inori Aizawa video as "pretty exciting and keeps true to the feel of intense action science-fiction", and that Inori helps Microsoft to "tap into the power and influence of Japanese anime to promote Internet Explorer." Mark Wilson of WinBeta agreed, finding it to be "pretty impressive stuff". Windows Phone Central commented on the video also, writing "[it is] a pretty cool new ad for IE from Microsoft", and found the scenes to be "pretty epic", while Wayne Williams of BetaNews said "it's certainly a different way to attract people to the browser." Karliah Eun of Kicker Daily News wrote "Microsoft has gone a long way from bad anthropomorphic characters to so-so bland personas. However, their latest offering [Inori] won't disappoint you." Carly Smith of The Escapist wrote that "Inori hits the anime checklist with [a] magical girl transformation scene and cutesy personality." Mary-Anne Lee of Games in Asia listed the character as one of the reasons why Anime Festival Asia 2013 is "worth checking out", claiming that "the internets have been exploding with the Internet Explorer girl [Inori]."

The character was also popular around the internet, with a large number of fanart being submitted featuring the character, as well as cosplayers. The video and character of Inori were both met with widespread approval from viewers, some professing that they had switched back to IE, while others called it a "stylish campaign" but were still reluctant to use Internet Explorer. The character's Facebook profile has also been a success, amounting to over 17,000 likes, with 400 coming within the first two days. On the other hand, Liberty Voice questioned why Microsoft had created such a strong ad campaign with so little information about their actual product. Reviews gathered and published within the article show that although Inori was considered an attractive mascot, the browser itself had removed a desired feature for one interviewee, and caused others to question exactly why Microsoft focused their advertisement on Inori rather than Internet Explorer. Nick Summers of The Next Web thought that Inori's promo video was "all rather confusing", "unexpected" and "certainly different to old Clippy", while Peter Bright of Ars Technica found it to be "really rather weird", though he did claim "I like the music." The Mary Sue commented " we can't stop trying to make this make sense, and it's really hurting our brains", and jokingly wrote "this video also marks the first time we've ever seen anyone switch to Internet Explorer to solve a problem." The Tech Report also reviewed Inori negatively, stating "I'm still shaking my head and laughing over here", specifically titling the article "Microsoft Pimps Internet Explorer with Anime Mascot," while Abrition found Inori to be "a bit weird" due to being able to read her personal attributes and "odd" due to the fact that she had a personalized biography.

== See also ==
- OS-tan
- Moe anthropomorphism
- Hikaru Aizawa
