= Seun Osewa =

Nigerian internet entrepreneur

- Born: Oluwaseun Temitope Osewa; July 17, 1982 (age 44)
- Education: Obafemi Awolowo University
- Occupations: Computer programmer, entrepreneur
- Years active: 2005–present
- Known for: Founder of Nairaland
- Title: CEO of Nairaland
- Website: nairaland.com/Seun

Oluwaseun Temitope Osewa (born July 17, 1982) is a Nigerian internet entrepreneur. He is the founder of Nairaland, a popular internet forum launched in March 2005, which was projected as the biggest African forum by Forbes. YNaija listed him as one of the most innovative Nigerians in technology. He was also listed among T.I.N Magazine's top 10 most influential Nigerian online entrepreneurs in 2015.

== Early life and education ==
Seun hails from Ogun State, born on 17 July 1982. He dropped out of school when he was a student of electrical engineering in 1998 at Obafemi Awolowo University.

== Career ==
=== Founding of Nairaland ===
Osewa founded Nairaland in March 2005 as a general purpose online discussion forum targeted primarily at Nigerians. The platform was created to facilitate conversations on politics, business, education, technology, and social issues.

Nairaland operates on an advertising-based revenue model and was built without external venture capital funding. Osewa has stated that the platform was launched with minimal startup capital and scaled organically through user growth and online advertising.
