= Hikaru Aizawa =

- Aizawa Hikaru
- Created by: shinia
- Japanese name: あいざわひかる
- Chinese name: 藍澤光

In-universe information
- Nickname: 小光
- Gender: Female
- Birthday: Sep 27

Hikaru Aizawa (藍澤光) is a virtual brand ambassador and product mascot created by Microsoft's Taiwan branch, as a moe anthropomorphism character created for the development technology platform Microsoft Silverlight. The character design and figure drawing were made by shinia, the dōjin painter, and the dubbing work by Minmin Yao. At first, Hikaru Aizawa was one of Microsoft Taiwan's "2010 Tech Days" campaign plannings, but immediately after its launch it received a wide response from Japan, Taiwan and Hong Kong (SAR), which made Microsoft Taiwan decide to propose the character settings of three elder sisters, Yu, Aoi, and Lei, one after another. Afterwards, Microsoft Taiwan continuously conducted a series of official campaigns, including related software, special wallpapers, webpage games, related activities and amateur parties.

== Planning ==
Hikaru was, at first, as one of Microsoft Taiwan's "2010 Tech Days" campaign plannings, a software virtual character designed with the purpose to promote the technological revision of Microsoft Silverlight; prior to that, the agent manufacturer of Windows 7 in Japan, Windows 7 Mania, had designed a non-official virtual character Madobe Nanami, which was later approved by Microsoft and used by them for promotion.

== See also ==
- OS-tan
- Inori Aizawa
