= Moe anthropomorphism =

Form of anthropomorphism in anime and manga

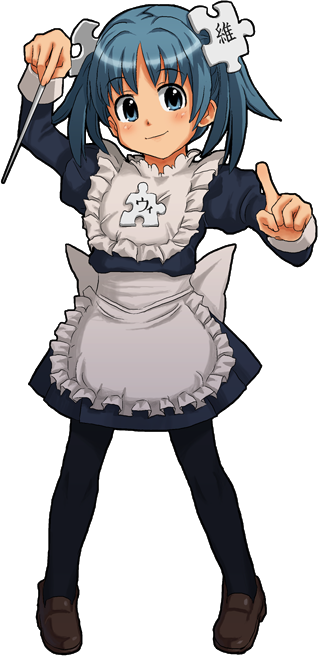
Wikipe-tan, a combination of the Japanese word for Wikipedia and the cutesy variant of the suffix -chan, -tan, is a moe anthropomorph of Wikipedia.

Moe anthropomorphism (Japanese: 萌え擬人化, Hepburn: moe gijinka) is a form of anthropomorphism in anime, manga and games where moe qualities are given to non-human beings (such as animals, plants, supernatural entities and fantastical creatures), objects, concepts, or phenomena. In addition to moe features, moe anthropomorphs are also characterized by their accessories, which serve to emphasize their original forms before anthropomorphosis. The characters here, usually in a kind of cosplay, are drawn to represent an inanimate object or popular consumer product. Part of the humor of this personification comes from the personality ascribed to the character (often satirical) and the sheer arbitrariness of characterizing a variety of machines, objects, and locations as cute.

This form of anthropomorphism is very common in otaku subcultures. With the exception of kemonomimi (which are human-like characters that have animal features), many moe anthropomorphizations started as dōjin efforts. An early form of moe anthropomorphism is the Gundam MS Girl created by Mika Akitaka in 1982. Many anthropomorphizations were the results of discussions on Japanese Internet forums such as 2channel or Futaba Channel. The trend spread out of dōjin circles as commercial anime and manga also prominently feature characters who are personifications of inanimate objects.

== Sociological aspects ==
The media studies scholar Yuji Sone has argued that since moe anthropomorphism is usually personified by beautiful young girls, it is an example of the outgrowth of otaku subcultural habitus into sexual fantasies. The psychologist Tamaki Saitō regards moe anthropomorphism as an example of mitate-e art due to its simultaneous use of both high and low art to provide additional, sometimes humorous, meanings. Saitō also connects this anthropomorphism with a "desire for transformation" associated with the shōjo (girl) form.

== Types ==
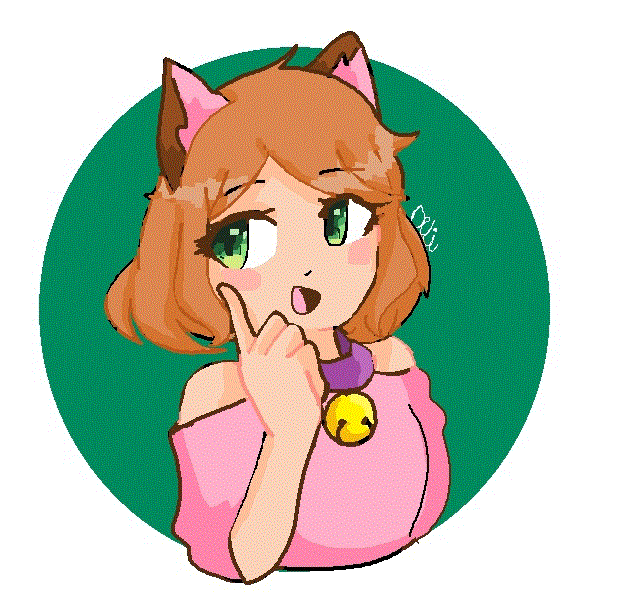
A nekomimi, a type of kemonomimi with the ears of a cat

=== Animals ===
Kemonomimi (獣耳), literally meaning "animal ears", is the concept of depicting human and human-like characters with animal ears, and by extension, other features such as tails. Kemonomimi is often used in moe anthropomorphism, to depict animal characters in human form. Catgirls and catboys are the most prolific and common in this category, although bunnygirls, foxgirls, doggirls, and wolfgirls are also common. Kemonomimi characters typically appear human except for added animal-like qualities. In Hiroki Azuma's theory of otaku database consumption, animal ears are one type of "moe element," which is combined with other elements in a character in order to create an affective response in fans. A notable franchise featuring moe anthropomorphism and kemonomimi is Kemono Friends, which is focused on a myriad of anthropomorphized animals in the form of girls and young women, ranging from real and extinct animals to cryptids and legendary creatures. Another notable series is Umamusume: Pretty Derby which focuses on girls as famous Japanese racehorses. Mimiketto is a doujinshi convention dedicated to kemonomimi works.

=== Mythological and fantasy creatures ===
When moe appearances are given to various creatures from folklore, mythology or fantasy, they are usually called monster girls (or sometimes boys). Their bestial traits may be fully retained, de-emphasized into mere personality tics or removed altogether. An early example of this is with the video game/doujin soft series Touhou Project beginning in 1996 which depicts yōkai and other mythical beings as young beautiful girls and women who use magic to unleash a barrage of intricate projectile patterns called danmaku, or bullet hell. It was further popularized by such manga as Monster Musume and A Centaur's Life, and has grown into its own genre. Rarely, the monster girls are relatively unchanged from their original form and personality, such as mermaids and centaurides.

The fan-created Bowsette, a gender-swapped and moe anthropomorphized version of the Mario antagonist Bowser that gives him the appearance of Princess Peach via the "Super Crown" powerup, became one of the most popular Internet memes of 2018. The popularity of the character later led to other Mario enemies being given moe interpretations, the most prominent of which was Boosette (based on the King Boo character).

=== Computers ===
Although Chobits (2001) and Toy's iMac Girl (1998) came first, the meme of turning computer-related phenomena into moe subjects did not start until Shiitake-chan (しいたけちゃん), the anthropomorphization of Internet Explorer's Stop button. The idea of Shiitake-chan came in 2001 on 2channel, starting with a poster who claims he saw the Stop button as a shiitake. When Microsoft released Windows 7 in Japan, they included a theme pack centered around a personification of the OS named "Nanami Madobe" with voice samples from Nana Mizuki. Microsoft used another personification involving two girls named "Yū Madobe" and "Ai Madobe" to promote Windows 8 in Japan. As part of the market launch, a Facebook draw of 8 followers took place when follower count reached 80001; and total Twitter follower count for Yū and Ai reach 8001, where winners receive Madobe Yū and Ai-themed prizes.

Since the creation of the Microsoft-related OS-tans, other software and websites have been anthropomorphized as well. For example, Wikipedia has its own "Wikipe-tan", while Mozilla applications have their own set of "Moezilla". Chinese netizens have created a "Green Dam Girl" to parody China's content-control software Green Dam Youth Escort. In 2010, Taiwanese illustrator known as "shinia" on Pixiv created a personification of Microsoft Silverlight named Hikaru Aizawa, who is officially promoted by Microsoft Taiwan. In 2013, Microsoft Singapore introduced Inori Aizawa, a mascot for Internet Explorer.

The manga and anime series World War Blue features characters who are personifications of computer games. Video games with characters based on them include Sonic the Hedgehog, Super Mario and Tetris. Sega Hard Girls features personifications of video game hardware by Sega.

=== Law and politics ===
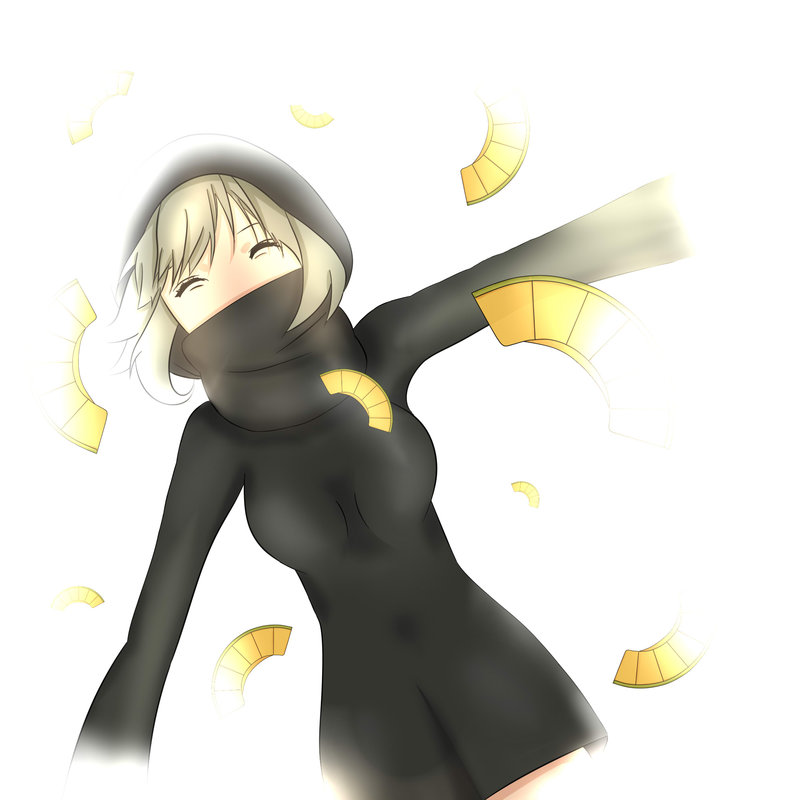
ISIS-chan is the moe anthropomorphism of ISIS.

Elements of the Japanese constitution have been anthropomorphized into moe girls, such as Article 9, which prevents Japan from waging war, being "portrayed as a peace-loving girl."

In 2010, users from the Breaking News board on 2channel created Hinomoto Oniko as an anthropomorphism of the commonly used Chinese ethnic slur used against Japanese, Riben guizi (日本鬼子), literally meaning "Japanese devils". The character was made by the 2channel community in response to the growing anti-Japanese sentiment amongst Chinese netizens online, and has since become an Internet meme within Japanese imageboards and forums. In Japanese, the kun'yomi reading of the kanji which make up the racial slur can be interpreted as a female personal name, and so the character is depicted as a young female wearing a traditional Japanese kimono, along with devil horns and a katana.

In 2015, Internet users created "ISIS-chan" (ISISちゃん), a moe anthropomorphized character of the jihadist group Islamic State of Iraq and Syria (ISIS). Images of her have been used by Anonymous to dilute the Islamic State's online propaganda.

=== Others ===
Other things have also been given moe characteristics:

Cells
The manga Cells at Work! depicts the cells of the human body as both male and female characters.
Charcoal
Based on binchōtan and other types of charcoal, the anime and manga Binchō-tan uses the dajare in the Japanese word for coal (炭, tan) to create a series of cute girls.
Chemical elements and compounds
Many online artists have depicted chemical elements as human characters in their illustrations, webcomics and video games. Anthropomorphism of chemical elements is created more than that of chemical compounds. Notable examples are, a Japanese chemical company depicted their solvent products as moe in an online webcomic and another one is an ongoing English webcomic about personified chemical compounds by a Romanian illustrator who works as a drycleaner.
Countries
As with national personifications, moe versions of various countries are present. For example, Japan is Nihon-chan, Afghanistan is Afuganisu-tan, and Pakistan is Pakisu-tan—each with its own webcomics in Japan. Beyond these, however, are the countries of Hidekaz Himaruya's Hetalia: Axis Powers, a manga depicting the countries involved in World War I and World War II using mostly men with a few women mixed in. Toshio Miyake argues that Hetalia's appeal lies in its combination of comedy and male personification of nations, with implicit homoerotic themes.
Cultural relics
In a more unique take on moe anthropomorphizations of Chinese cultural artifacts and heritage sites like the Goujian Sword, "Ironed models" of the Yangshi Lei Archives and even the Great Wall of China was the central theme in the 2021 Donghua The Country of Rare Treasure (Nation of Treasure) 秘宝之国
Diseases
During the 2014 Western African Ebola virus epidemic, a user of the website 4chan created an image depicting a moe version of Ebola known as Ebola-chan. During the COVID-19 pandemic, a moe version of the Coronavirus disease 2019 named Corona-chan was created.
Food and beverages
Habanero-tan, the unofficial mascot of Bōkun Habanero; and Bisuke-tan for biscuits that KFC sells in Japan. The light novel series Akikan! has soda cans that magically turn into girls. Jelly flavors have also been anthropomorphized.
Historic eras
A series of Japanese history books features anthropomorphism of historic events.
Home appliances
Erotic computer games Like Life and Monogokoro, Monomusume both feature home appliances as girls. These appliances include washing machines, alarm clocks, blackboard erasers, pillows, first aid boxes, mobile phones, and even post boxes, among others. The very nature of such games, however, puts the main characters in unusual situations when the sex scene happens—such as essentially "having sex with the washing machine". Likewise, the manga 090 Eko to Issho features girls who are mobile phones.
Military hardware
"Mecha musume" (メカ娘, Mecha girls) are anthropomorphic personifications of military hardware, such as guns, tanks, ships, aircraft or even missiles, taking the form of mechas, i.e. directly wearing the armament as robot elements, one of the earliest example being the Gundam "MS girl" (MS少女, MS shōjo). Popular subjects of this kind of anthropomorphism notably include World War II military vehicles, such as the World Witches franchise for aircraft and tanks, or the Kantai Collection and Azur Lane franchises for "ship girls" (艦娘, Kanmusu, abbreviation of Kantai Musume).
Vehicles
Notable trains which were drawn as girls include the Fastech 360, often drawn with cat ears because of the train's emergency air braking plates. Called "Fastech-tan", this particular "train girl" has its own collectible figure, sold with permission from the East Japan Railway Company. The bishōjo game Maitetsu and its anime version Rail Romanesque feature Railords, anthropomorphized train characters paired up with the real trains.

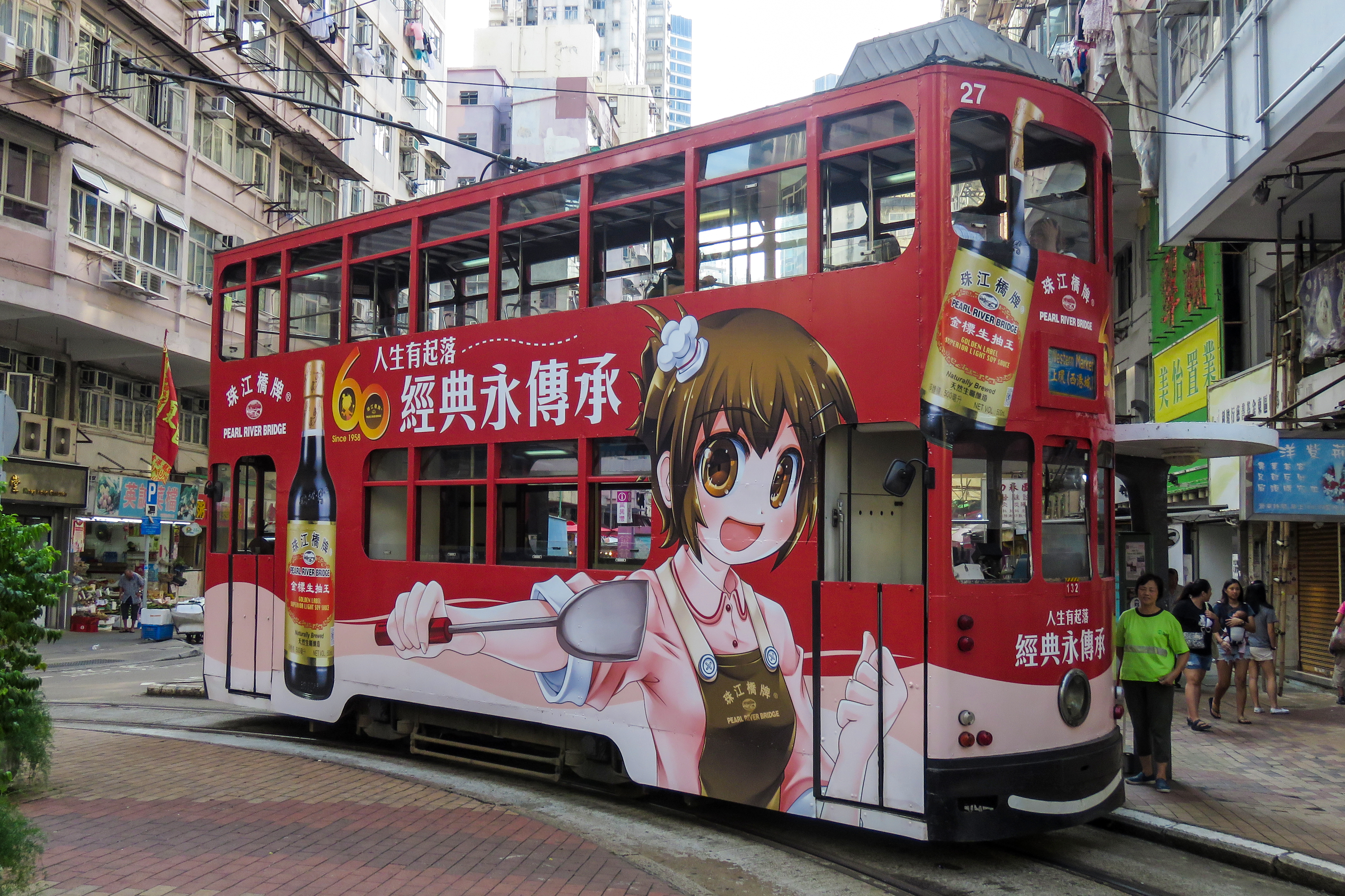
A Hong Kong Tram vehicle with the livery of a moe anthropomorphized character of a local soy sauce brand
