= Uchi–soto =

Japanese word distinguishing in-groups and out-groups

Uchi–soto is the distinction between in-groups (内, uchi; "inside") and out-groups (外, soto; "outside"). This distinction between groups is a fundamental part of Japanese social custom and sociolinguistics and is even directly reflected in the Japanese language itself.

== Concept ==
The basic concept revolves around dividing people into in-groups and out-groups. When speaking with someone from an out-group, the out-group must be honored, and the in-group humbled. That is achieved with special features of the Japanese language, which conjugates verbs based on both tense and politeness. It may also include social concepts such as gift giving or serving. The uchi–soto relationship can lead to someone making great personal sacrifices to honor a visitor or other person in an out-group.

One of the complexities of the uchi–soto relationship lies in the fact that groups are not static; they may overlap and change over time and according to situation.

Uchi–soto groups may be conceptualized as a series of overlapping circles. One's position within the group and relative to other groups depends on the context, situation, and time of life. For example, a person usually has a family, a job, and other groups or organizations to which they belong. Their position within the various groups and in relation to other groups changes according to circumstances at a given moment.

=== Examples ===
A company employee may occupy a superior position within the specific company but a humble one in relation to the company's customers. The same employee may hold a black belt, giving them a superior position within a karate club but may be a beginner at tennis and thus occupy an inferior position in the tennis club.

The workplace is a typical example: the employees below a middle manager are in his in-group and may be spoken to using casual speech. His bosses or even, in large companies, people in other departments, are in an out-group and must be spoken to politely. However, when dealing with someone from another company, the middle manager's entire company is the in-group, and the other company is the out-group. Thus, it is acceptable for the middle manager to speak about his own company, even his bosses, in non-honorific speech. That emphasizes that his company is one group, and although the group may have subdivisions inside of itself, it does not include the other company.

For example, when speaking with subordinates, a manager might omit the honorific -san, but he would be unlikely to do so when addressing his superiors. On the other hand, when dealing with an outsider, essentially any person not directly connected to his company, he omits all honorifics to speak about anyone in the company, including his superiors.

However, when the same manager speaks to a subordinate about the subordinate's family, he refers to the subordinate's family, which is the subordinate's in-group but not his, in polite terms. However, he refers to his own family, which is his in-group but not the subordinate's, in plain language.

Thus, the manager and the subordinate both refer to their own families as kazoku (family) and to the other's family as go-kazoku (honorable family).

In addition to features of the Japanese language, uchi–soto also extends to social actions. For instance, in a Japanese home the most senior family member, usually the father or grandfather, normally takes a bath first; the rest of the family follows in order of seniority.

A visitor to the home, however, is offered the first bath. Similarly, an overnight guest is offered the best sleeping arrangements even if it greatly inconveniences the rest of the family. That case is a difficult point for Westerners in Japan, who have usually been taught to be polite by refusing accommodations that inconvenience others.

== Language examples ==
For detailed information, see honorific speech in Japanese.

Japanese honorific language ("keigo") is divided into three forms: polite, humble and respectful. Within these forms are specific words and prefixes.

For example, the verb "to eat" may be given as follows:

- taberu (plain: "I/we/you/they eat" or "he/she/it eats")
- itadaku (humble, literally "to receive", used to refer to oneself or one's in-group)
- meshiagaru (respectful, used to refer to one's superior)

The noun "a drink" may be given as follows;

- nomimono (one's own drink), or
- o-nomimono (someone else's drink)

Nouns involving the family, the household, or familial relations normally take honorific prefixes when denoting an out-group and not when denoting an in-group.

Some nouns change completely for the same reasons, such as chichi and haha ("my father", "my mother") vs. o-tō-san and o-kā-san ("your father" and "your mother", and they are also used to address one's own parents respectfully).

== See also ==
- Honne and tatemae
- Social identity
