= Hinomoto Oniko =

Moe anthropomorphic character

Hinomoto Oniko (right) along with Konipon (left)

Hinomoto Oniko (日本 鬼子) is a Japanese moe character created in 2010 which originated from the Breaking News (VIP) Board on 2channel, and has since become an internet meme within various forums and imageboards in Japan. The character is a moe anthropomorphism based on the Chinese phrase riben guizi, a commonly used Chinese ethnic slur against people of Japanese descent.

== Backgrounds ==
The character was originally conceived by users on a 2ch board as a satire of the aforementioned Chinese racial term. In China, the term rìběn guǐzi (日本鬼子; 'Japanese devil') is a phrase used since World War II, and still used today, as a disparaging epithet against the Japanese. Japanese netizens chose to transform the normally racist and offensive phrase into a character which could be depicted as "cute" or moe, in an expression that the negative connotations behind the slur can be reversed. The creation of the character in 2010 follows the escalation of the Senkaku Islands dispute as a result of the fishing trawler collision incident which occurred not too long before, and was intended as a "hit back" response against growing anti-Japanese sentiment amongst Chinese netizens online and within the public opinion of Chinese people in general following the island dispute incident.

== Etymology ==
In Japanese, the slur 日本鬼子 is generally read as rīben guizu (リーベングイズ), a direct transliteration of the Mandarin rìběn guǐzi. However, the characters can be alternately read using kun'yomi and nanori readings as Hinomoto Oniko, which in Japanese resembles a female name. Within the Kun'yomi reading, the character's "surname" Hi no moto can have the literal meaning "origin of the sun", whilst Japanese given names ending in 子 (-ko) are considered feminine, and are generally used as girls' names (for example, 山田花子 Yamada Hanako is a placeholder female name).

== Characteristics ==
The main design motif is based on the Oni in Japanese folklore. Since the character was designed to be a "personification" of the slur, she is portrayed as a young woman with long black hair and pale skin, often wearing a red kimono and demon horns, whilst holding various motifs unique to Japanese culture, such as a naginata and a hannya mask. She also can become more powerful when fighting or when provoked.

=== Konipon ===
"Konipon" (or Kohinomoto) (derived from another Chinese slur, Xiao riben "小日本" pinyin: xiǎo rìběn), who is depicted as a young girl of similar appearance, and also carries Japanese culture-related motifs along with her such as a katana as tall as her, and a pink kimono. She is shown to be very affectionate to people, due to her name in hiragana "こひのもと" being read as "The essence of love".

== See also ==
- ISIS-chan
