= Corona-chan =

Moe anthropomorphization of COVID-19

Corona-chan (Japanese: コロナちゃん, romanized: koronachan) is a moe anthropomorphization of COVID-19 which became a popular meme on 4chan, Reddit and other websites during the height of the COVID-19 pandemic in March 2020.

In mid-January 2020, 4chan users created the Corona-chan character as a girl with bat wings and green eyes wearing a red cheongsam, an item of traditional Chinese clothing, with thorny spheres for hair buns, symbolizing the virus. In some representations, she holds the flag of China and hands out bat soup. These features reference the popular bat soup and Wuhan lab theories for the origin of the virus. On 4chan, a user made a thread titled "All hail, Peng Zhou, creator of Corona-Chan", linking to an article by Zero Hedge, claiming that the new coronavirus may have been created by the Wuhan Institute of Virology at the Chinese Academy of Sciences. As a pun, she was also often represented holding or drinking a Corona beer.

The subreddit "r/coronachan", which features illustrations of the character, had 2,000 members by 2020. There are Corona-chan galleries on the Internet. Lushsux created a wall graffiti showing Corona-chan standing behind a mask-wearing PewDiePie. Moe anthropomorphism had been applied to diseases online before: during the Ebola virus outbreak of West Africa in 2014, the character of Ebola-chan was circulating on image boards and online discussion forums in the English-speaking world.

== Reactions ==
Samantha Cole of Vice Media claimed that Corona-chan is Chinese at first sight, which is racially offensive, but that the character could also provide a lighthearted reprieve from the news.

Some non-Chinese women who cosplayed Corona-chan and posted photos on the Internet were criticized by Chinese users and eventually apologized. The women said the behavior was not meant to insult or discriminate against others, but to inform the public about the importance of washing hands to prevent infectious diseases.

Michał Radomił Wiśniewski worried that this meme would inflame racism against Chinese or Asians, and he pointed out that some Corona-chan works better avoid this, such as Ken Ashcorp's "Komm Süsser Tod" video, in which Corona-chan is depicted as a vampire rather than as a woman in a Chinese dress.

According to the Federal Protection Service report, some online users referred to COVID-19 as Corona-chan while discussing the use of COVID-19 as a biological weapon.

Corona-chan was briefly added to Yandere Simulator in April 2020, before being removed by the developer after substantial criticism from the game's fanbase.

== See also ==
- Ebola-chan, an earlier moe anthropomorphization of a disease
