= Guizi =

Pejorative Chinese language slang term for foreigners

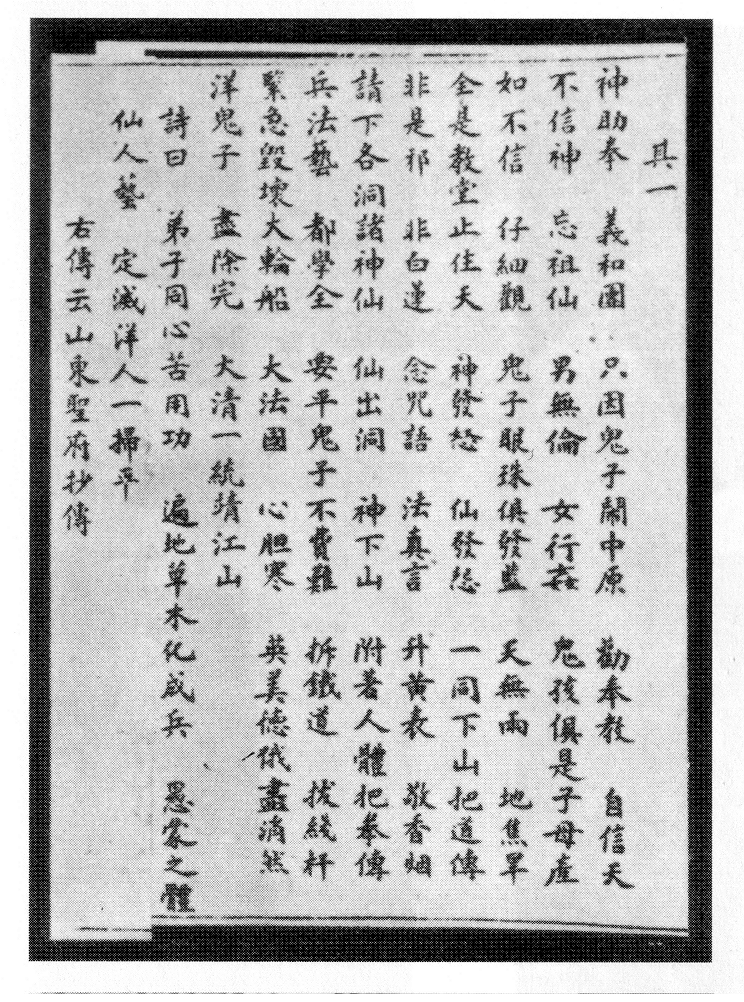
A pamphlet circulated c. 1899 during the Boxer Rebellion that refers to foreigners as guizi (鬼子) or yang guizi (洋鬼子)

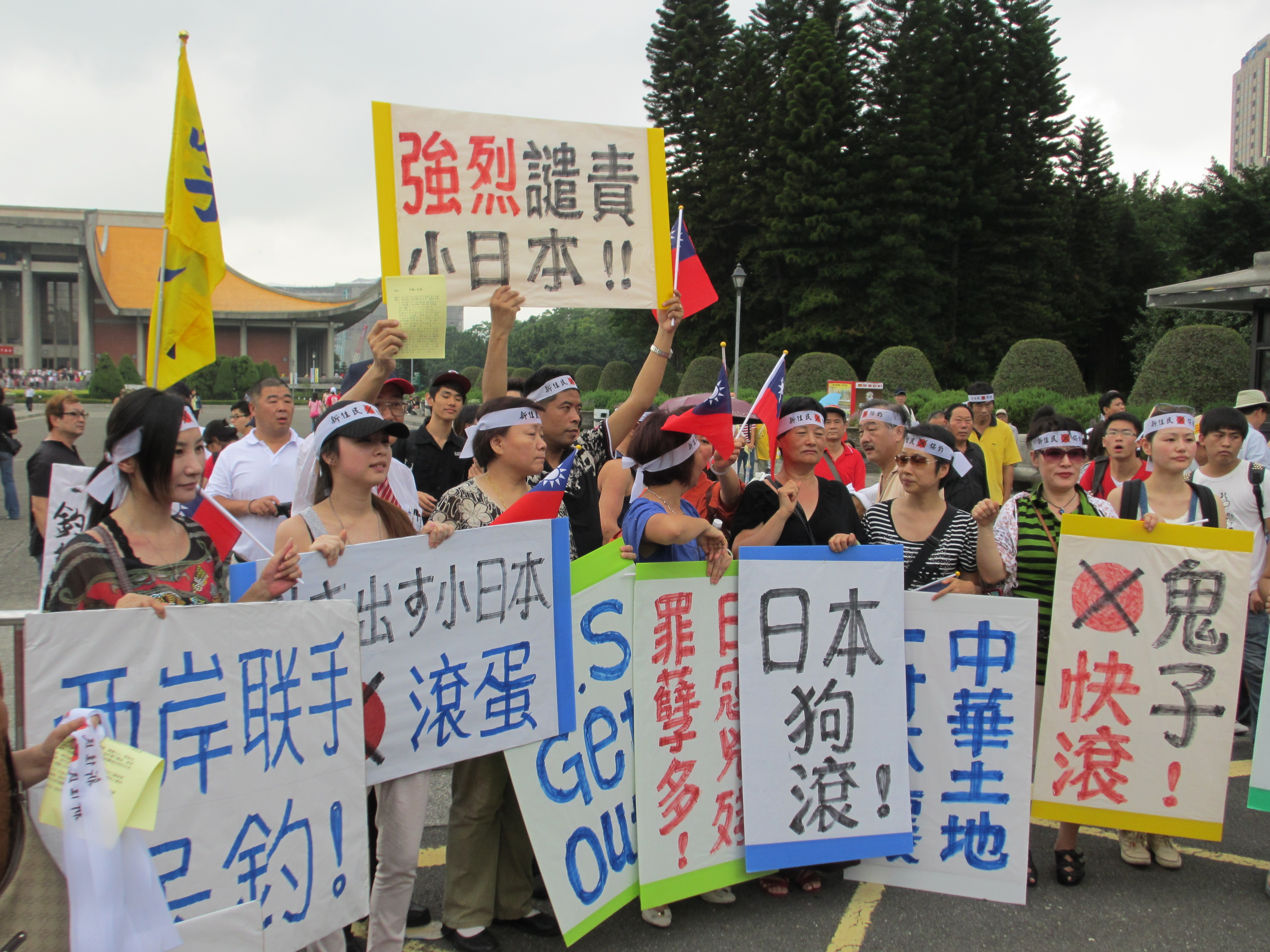
New Party Anti-Japanese demonstrators in Taiwan hoist signs with "Guizi! Get out" (鬼子！快滾) following an escalation in the Senkaku Islands dispute in 2012.

Guizi (Chinese: 鬼子; pinyin: guǐzi; lit. 'devil-spawn') is a pejorative Chinese slang term referring to foreigners, with a history of xenophobic connotations.

== History ==
Starting with the arrival of European sailors in the sixteenth century, foreigners were often perceived in China as "uncivilized tribes given to mayhem and destruction". In the southern parts of China, the term gweilo (鬼佬) was used; this term remains popular today in the Cantonese-speaking regions of China. In northern parts, the term 'western devil' (西洋鬼子 xiyáng guǐzi) was used.

== Use ==
The character gui (鬼) can have negative connotations itself without the zi (子) suffix, which can mean "son" or simply be an interjection. For example, when it was attached to the Westerners in the term yang guizi (洋鬼子 'overseas devils') during the Boxer Rebellion, to the Japanese military in the term guizi bing (鬼子兵 'devil soldiers') during the Second Sino-Japanese War, and to the Korean collaborators with the term er guizi (二鬼子 'second-rank devil'). It can also be used as an adjective to express hatred and deprecation. However, the same term can also be applied derogatorily to any foreign military which was an enemy to China. In Taiwan, anti-Japanese demonstrators from the New Party hoisted signs with "Guizi! Get out" (鬼子！快滾) during the 2012 China anti-Japanese demonstrations. Local expressions towards the Japanese during their occupation of China during World War II also used gui. The term conveys a generalized negative feeling; it is somewhat archaic in contemporary use, and other comparatively negative terms have largely replaced it.

== Related terms ==
- Riben guizi (日本鬼子; 'Japanese devil') or dongyang guizi (東洋鬼子; dōngyáng guǐzi; 'east ocean devil') — used to refer to Japanese. In 2010 Japanese internet users on 2channel created the fictional moe character Hinomoto Oniko (日本鬼子) which refers to the ethnic term, with Hinomoto Oniko being the Japanese kun'yomi reading of the Chinese characters 日本鬼子.
- Er guizi (二鬼子; 'second-rank devil') — used to refer to ethnic Korean conscripts and parapoliceman who contributed to the Japanese occupation and war effort during the Second Sino-Japanese War and the Pacific War. It was later extended to refer to all collaborators with the Japanese, including hanjians and Taiwanese conscripts. In modern times, however, the terms became synonymous with race traitor, referring to any Chinese nationals and overseas Chinese who act as appeasers or promoters of foreign interests at the expense of Chinese national interests.
- Yang guizi (洋鬼子; 'overseas devil') or xiyang guizi (Chinese: 西洋鬼子; pinyin: xiyáng guǐzi; lit. 'west ocean devil') — used to refer to Westerners.
- Jia yang guizi (假洋鬼子; 'fake overseas devil') — used to refer to "sellout" Chinese who adopt Western values and are discriminatory to their own ethnic identity and cultural heritage. Initially used to describe compradors and foreign-educated scholars during the late 19th century, who often dressed and talked like Westerners, the term is now synonymous to race traitors. A similar word in English is "Uncle Chan", which is derived from Uncle Tom and used to describe a xenophilic Hongkonger—and by further extension any westernized Chinese, regardless of mainland or overseas origin—who are perceived as self-hating, supporting Hong Kong independence and pandering to sinophobia in order to gain favor from Westerners.
- Hei guizi (黑鬼子; 'black devil') — used to refer to Black people.

== See also ==
- Ang mo
- Gaijin — Japanese word for foreigners
- Jap
- The Sword March, the National Revolutionary Army marching cadence which popularized its use against the Japanese
- Xiao Riben
