= OS-tan =

Personification of operating systems

Box art of Windows 8.1 Pro DSP Memorial Pack with a group of OS-tans from left to right: Claudia (Microsoft Azure), Yuu and Ai (Windows 8.1), and Nanami Madobe (Windows 7).

OS-tans are moe anthropomorphic personifications of popular operating systems, originating on the Japanese imageboard Futaba Channel. The designs of the OS-tans, which were created by various amateur Japanese artists, are typically female; for example, the personifications of Microsoft Windows operating systems are often depicted as sisters of varying ages. The -tan element in the term is a hypocoristic suffix in Japanese that implies extremely youthful endearment.

Though initially appearing only in fan works, the OS-tans proved popular enough that Microsoft branches in Asian countries such as Singapore, Hong Kong, Macau, Taiwan and Japan used the OS-tan personification concept as the basis for advertising campaigns for Microsoft Windows, Internet Explorer and Microsoft Silverlight, respectively.

== History ==
The concept of the OS-tan is reported to have begun as a personification of the common perception of Windows Me (Released in 2000 by Microsoft as the 9x counterpart to Windows 2000) as unstable and prone to frequent crashes. Discussions on Futaba Channel likened this to the stereotype of a fickle, troublesome girl and as this personification expanded Me-tan was created and followed by the other characters. One of the early works to predominantly feature the OS-tan was an interactive Flash animation showing a possible intro to an imaginary anime show known as Trouble Windows. It was first published on 2004-04-19 and appears to have quickly spread worldwide, its first known appearance outside of Futaba Channel being on the site Misfile. However, it may have spread more widely after the flash animation was uploaded to YouTube in 2005.

== Commercial products ==
Ohzora Publishing produced one book based on OS-tan characters, titled Trouble Windows OS-tan FanBook (とらぶる・うぃんどうず OSたんファンブック). It includes illustrations by over 25 contributors. It also includes 95-tan, ME-tan, XP-tan figures, titled OS Girl 95, OS Girl me, OS Girl XP respectively, but include a molded space for 2k-tan (named OS Girl 2K).

ME-tan, 2K-tan, XP-tan were designed by GUHICO of Stranger Workshop, while 95-tan was designed by Fujisaki Shiro from H.B.Company.

Parthenon Production Limited, company had commercialized Pink Company's OS-tan products.

MALINO from Deja Vu ArtWorks produced the Me Document and Shared Folder! trilogy, which were sold in digital format.

The Japanese version of Windows 7 Ultimate DSP Edition includes the unofficial Nanami Madobe mascot. This inspired Microsoft Taiwan to launch an official mascot for Microsoft Silverlight, Hikaru. This was followed up by giving Hikaru "sisters", Lei, Aoi, and Yu.

A special package of the Japanese Windows 7 Ultimate DSP Edition, called the Touch Mouse Artist Edition or Touch Mouse Limited Edition Artist Series, came with an animated tutorial Windows theme (with custom sounds and three desktop backgrounds) featuring Madobe Nanami.

== Tan suffix ==
The Japanese suffix tan (たん) is a mispronunciation of chan (ちゃん), an informal, intimate, and diminutive honorific suffix for a person, used for friends, family, and pets. In this case, the mispronunciation is used intentionally to achieve the contrived cute or charming effect that is commonly associated with its use by young children and is also sometimes added to the names of non-mascot characters. The personifications as a whole are commonly simply called mascots or mascot characters, and as such the -tan suffix itself means nothing outside its role as an honorific and its implications of cuteness. Normal suffixes, including -san, -chan, and -kun are also used in the name of some OS-tan, depending on the character and the speaker's preference; the suffix may indeed be omitted entirely.

== Classic OS-tans ==
=== MS-DOS ===
MS-DOS-tan is most commonly represented as a shy schoolgirl, with black or dark grey hair in pigtails decorated with "DOS"-shaped hair ties; her hair ties are usually blue, but are sometimes depicted in the colors of the MS-DOS prompt logo as shown in Windows. She wears round glasses, a white button-down blouse with a light blue skirt and suspenders. She carries around a keyboard, and is usually peeking around corners.

=== Windows 3.1 ===
Windows 3.1-tan is depicted as a gothic girl with a cat named "DOS-nuko" who represents MS-DOS 6.22. Some depictions of her are cheerful or deadpan. She has long white hair with red eyes, a purple bow on her hair, a lavender gothic dress and a purple bow on her chest with a "3.1" brooch. Her cat can transform into a cat girl with a nurse outfit. This specific design is called "Grandma", but she mostly looks young. 3.1-tan is called "oobaba-sama" which means "Grandma".

=== Windows 95 ===
Windows 95-tan is depicted as a Yamato nadeshiko who fought a battle with the Mac-tans in the 1990's and has retired. She was aware of developments of the Internet and multimedia, but however, she is unfamiliar with developments after Windows 95 such as the USB. She has long brown or orange hair, brown or pink eyes, and a bow of the Windows logo, a kimono of the hana256.bmp wallpaper in the Japanese version of Windows 95 and black sandals. She is often depicted as a motherly and kind woman.

=== Windows 98 ===
Windows 98-tan is a shy girl with an appearance of a middle school-aged person. She also has a mecha box, just like Windows 98SE-tan. She is 98SE-tan's sister. She has a dark history notebook. She has a blue bob cut, a golden 98 hair clip, blue eyes, a sleeveless white shirt and a blue or black skirt, blue or black thigh highs and brown or black shoes. She also has blue or black gloves.

Windows 98SE-tan is depicted as a girl with an appearance of a middle-school-aged person who is prone to aggression and holds a can opener with her. She is a fan of professional wrestling. She has a mecha box, which is inspired by Vulcan from Zatch Bell. She has periwinkle or blue hair, a side ponytail with a cherry shaped hair tie. She has a green or teal sailor uniform.

=== Windows 2000 ===
Windows 2000-tan is depicted as a brilliant, smart, and reliable girl. She is efficient at her work and can handle many tasks at the same time. She has a blue bob cut with metallic cat ears and glasses, a blue coat with a swimsuit of the windows logo, blue boots and sometimes depicted with a charger tail. She is often called 2K instead of 2000.

An alternate design of 2K-tan, known as Nyake, has a blue bob cut with real cat ears, a white tail, wears a pair of blue paw gloves and shoes, a red animal collar with a bell, a blue one piece bathing suit, and sometimes wears glasses.

=== Windows Me ===
Windows Me-tan is a clumsy girl and tries her best in everything, but as a result, she always fails, but is always cheerful. She is the first OS-tan in the Futaba Channel, being created on August 6, 2003. She has mint green braids with an ahoge, a blue maid dress, with an orange or red bow on the chest with the Windows Me system restore icon. She often carries a leek with her and her favorite food is a Japanese roll cake. 2K-tan is her guardian.

== New generation OS-tans ==
=== Windows XP ===
Windows XP Home-Tan is the twin sister of Windows XP Professional-Tan. She has a green ponytail with a metallic XP ornament on both sides, a green tracksuit, and glasses. She is a fujoshi that reads and writes yaoi comics.

Windows XP Professional-tan does her job without a hitch and is a good sleeper, but however, she is a very gluttonous eater because of the amount of HDD and RAM Windows XP required. She was created by XP Kaki-Aki, also known as Nac. She has dark hair with a XP hair pin, and ribbons. She wears a white and blue school girl outfit. Her human name is Saseko. The earliest design for a Windows XP character is a gynoid with a ponytail and glasses. Later, XP Kaki-Aki made a design with down hair, blue eyes, a blue bikini top that has "XP" and a blue skirt, blue thigh highs and one glove. The design changed after Windows XP SP2 was released.

Windows XP Media Center-tan is depicted as a blonde-haired woman with cat-eared orange headphones, glasses, and a green and orange stylized serafuku that bears a slight similarity to Saseko. She usually wears a pendant bearing a Media Center icon over her chest, and has been depicted carrying a remote on occasion. Her disposition is often portrayed as cheerful, although images with a more nonchalant look exist as well.

=== Windows Vista ===
There have been multiple depictions of a Vista-tan, and there is no agreed upon version, however, the most-known popular design is Chiivistan, a green haired girl with blue eyes, a black penguin coat that is see through, black shapewear, black thigh-highs, white collars, and black or white boots. She wears a collar bearing the Windows shield, and is sometimes seen having a scepter. There are two separate variations of Chiivistan in terms of appearance; one of these is that of a young girl in a slightly more conservative outfit, while the other is a more matured girl bearing physical maturity comparable to XP-tan.

The lesser-known designs are Vistake, a girl with silver hair, red eyes, a screw on her forehead, a red and white sailor fuku outfit, red and white striped stockings, and is sometimes seen having a scythe. Her sister is Visbou, a girl with gray short hair, red eyes, a blue ninja outfit, and a red scarf.

=== Windows 7 ===
Akiba PC reported that the first 7777 copies of Japanese Windows 7 Ultimate DSP editions include special wallpaper and sound sets for a character called Nanami Madobe (窓辺ななみ, Madobe Nanami), voiced by Nana Mizuki. Her name is a wordplay; 窓辺 (Romanji: Madobe) meaning "by the window" or "window sill" and ななみ (Romanji: Nanami) being a variation of a certain pronunciation of the word "seven" in Japanese. The character was designed by Wakaba. The premium set includes a Windows 7 theme featuring 3 Nanami wallpapers, 19 event sound sets, CD with 5 extra Nanami sounds. Regular DSP edition includes a digest Windows 7 theme including a Nanami wallpaper, an event sound set; the preorder users can also download an extra Nanami wallpaper and 6 event sound sets. This makes it the first OS-tan marketed by the company producing the operating system. In addition, the character also got its own Twitter account.

During the initial sales event of the Windows 7 DSP edition, the official profile of the character has also been revealed. It shows Madobe Nanami was born in 1992-04-06 (release date of Windows 3.1) 17 years of age (at the time of release), who lives in Chiyoda, Tokyo. Nanami is among an extended family of 16 members, and she has elder brother named Goichi (吾一), elder sister named Mutsumi (むつみ), mother named Mikaho (美佳穗) from Madobe (窓辺) family, father named Kyuuhachi (究八) from Shirato (白戸) family. Nanami and her cousin Claudia Madobe (クロード(蔵人)) later appeared in Microsoft's Cloud Girl comic strip.

=== Windows 8 ===
The Japanese Windows 8 Pro DSP editions were released in Madobe Yū (or Yuu, 窓辺ゆう) and Madobe Ai (窓辺あい) editions by Windows Navi+ (Techno-Alliance Corp.). Both versions (4,000 units per character, thus 8,000 total) include a Microsoft Wedge touch mouse with the Windows 8 logo, character-specific Windows theme (three theme pack wallpapers, event sounds in the respective character's voice), picture password images. In addition, Limited Akihabara Editions (444 units per character, 888 total), sold in Tokyo's Akihabara shopping district, include Madobe Ai/Yū edition of Microsoft Wedge Touch Mouse, an alternate character-specific event sound samples and theme pack and an alternate wallpaper for its respective character. Nipponbashi versions (500 units per character), sold in Nipponbashi in Osaka, include Microsoft Wedge touch mouse (with Ai and Yū decal), three theme pack wall papers (two common and one character-specific), and Yū or Ai event sounds. The Nipponbashi packages include different art. The 32/64-bit version availability depends on retailer.

Asuka Nishi voices the short-haired Yū, while Nao Tamura voices the long-haired Ai.

The Windows 8 Can Edition from Unitcom (available for the first 2,888 copies) included a notepad, T-shirt, two-way mouse pad, pocket media case, smart phone stand cleaning, two-way PC cleaner, Yū and Ai badges, and a freeze blanket.

The extended fictional Madobe family tree detailed that Yū is the older sister, and their parents are Eiichi (映一(えいいち)) from the Netsu (根津) family and Shii (椎(しい)) from the Madobe family. Yū and Ai were said to have a birthdate of 18 November 1996 (Windows CE's release date) with age 15, with height of 152 cm. This conflicts with other back-story materials suggesting that Ai is the younger sister.

MasatakaP and Electrocutica produced a Windows 8 music video titled "Through the Window", featuring Madobe characters Nanami, Yū (in silhouette), and Claudia. The video was presented as the opening to Microsoft's keynote on the second day of Windows Developer Days in Japan.

In 2012 and 2013, Windows Navi+ (Techno-Alliance Corp.) also created separate Twitter accounts for Ai and Yū, respectively.

Two theme songs for Yū and Ai – "Mir8cle Days" (ミラクルデイズ) and "Donna Mirai Demo" (どんな未来でも) were unveiled on 15 June 2013, and sold as a CD bundled with Windows 8 Pro DSP Edition, sold at TwinBox Akihabara.

=== Windows 8.1 ===
The Japanese Windows 8.1 Pro DSP edition Madobe Family version by Windows Navi+ (Techno-Alliance Corp.) is a limited (1000 units) version of Windows 8.1 Pro 32/64-bit edition with three types of Madobe family picture password wallpapers, Madobe character voices (Nanami, Yū, Ai, Claudia), Madobe family complete edition Windows theme pack, previously unpublished Madobe family designs, Final Pasocom Data Hikkoshi 9+ licence key, Skype three-month free trial, historical Windows logo stickers (XP, Vista, 7, 8). Other editions include a Memorial Pack version without voice, theme pack, stickers (6191 units); a 64-bit Windows Memorial Pack version with a Sculpt Mobile Mouse with Nanami decor (810 units). These editions were available for preorder on 2013-10-04 with release date on 2013-10-18. As part of the market launch, a Facebook draw of 8 followers took place when follower count reaches 80001; and total Twitter follower count for Yū and Ai reach 8001, where winners receive Yū- and Ai-themed prizes.

Additional types of Windows 8.1 Pro DSP edition Madobe family theme packs were also sold by Ark (TowerHill), ZOA Corporation, Tsukumo (Project White), Dospara, Buy More (Unit.com), Big Camera (Sofmap), and PC One. These versions include two types of wallpapers (Christmas, New Year), theme pack with system voices.

=== Windows 10 ===
᷄The name of the Windows 10 mascot was officially introduced as Tōko (or Touko) Madobe on 31 July 2015. As confirmed on the character's official Facebook page, her name is a homonym for one of the readings for the Japanese word for 'ten': too (とお). Her name was chosen by fans through an online poll. According to her fictional profile, her origins are the Madobe family and she is set 100 years in the future. She likes online gaming and supporting others. Her personal traits are being an excellent student, and expanding her knowledge on technology. Her manager often worries since she is a bit spontaneous. She also enjoys cheering on people who are working hard and doing their best. She has a part-time job at the Akibano Custom Computer Company where she is a rookie. This level of back story is rather unusual for OS-tan.

She, along with Nanami Madobe, was last featured in Windows 7 end-of-support informational content which including videos and a dedicated webpage produced between 2019 and January 2020 by the Japanese technology media site, Digital DIY.

=== Windows 11 ===
Although Microsoft Japan officially produced a series of OS-tans as part of marketing campaigns for earlier versions of Windows, Windows 11 has not received an official OS-tan. Since its release, there has been no new character from Microsoft Japan or Windows Navi+ to represent the operating system. This is likely because Windows Navi+, the campaign responsible for the Madobe characters, was primarily an advertising initiative, which appears to have been discontinued after the release of the Windows 10 Creators Update in 2017.

A fan-made character named Ichika Madobe or 11-chan has since gained popularity but has never been endorsed by Microsoft or Windows Navi+ as an official character. As a result, Ichika is not considered part of the official Madobe family. Her rising popularity can be attributed to fan adoption, with increased visibility following an Instagram reel posted by the official Windows account in 2024.

== Linux-tans ==
=== Linux ===
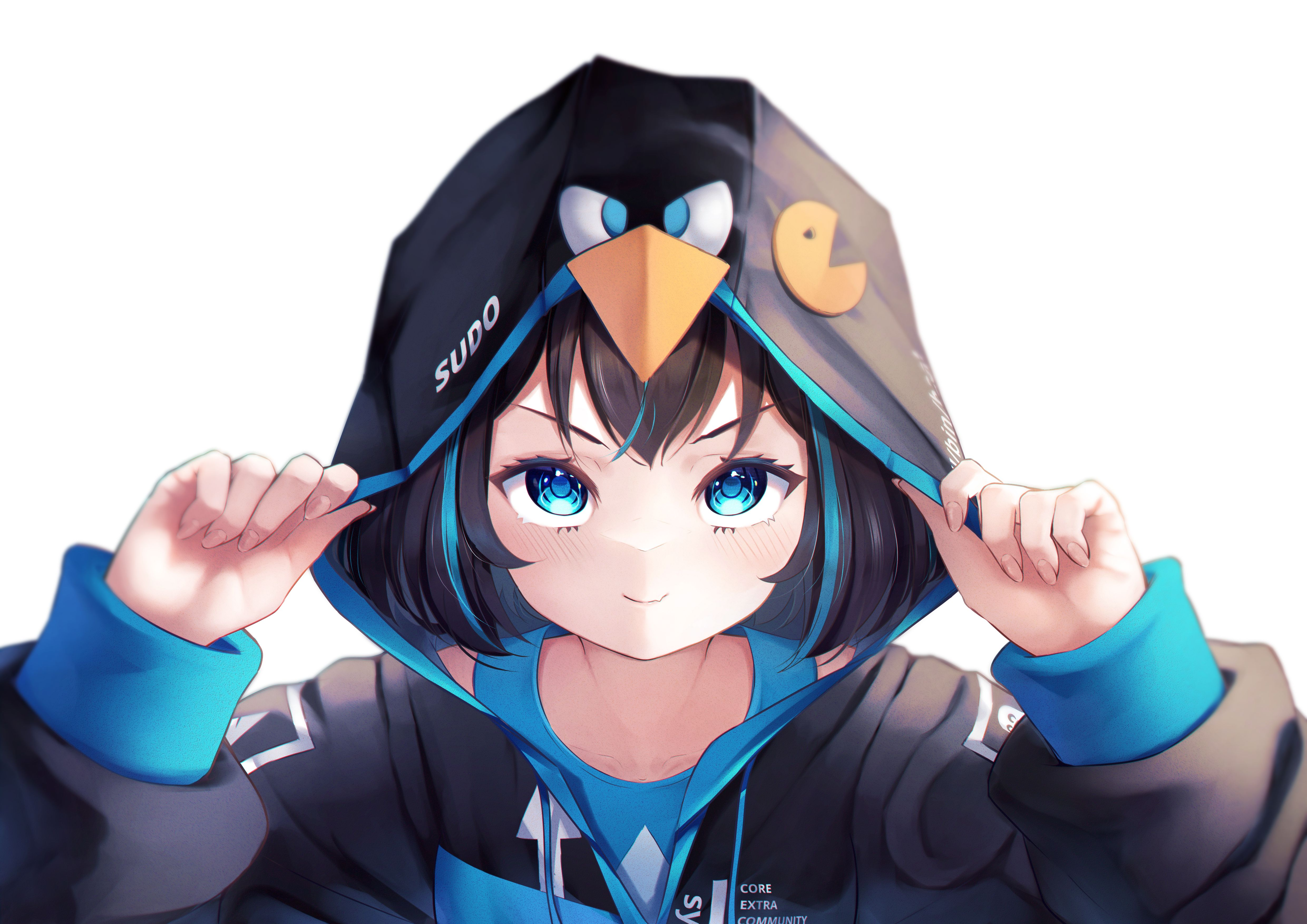
Fan art of Arch Linux-tan

Linux-tan is primarily based on the Linux mascot Tux, typically portrayed as having light skin, long hime-cut blueish or purple hair, red or pinkish eyes, a loose, sleeveless blue dress with gold accents, flipper-shaped shoes, a spear with multiple ribbons attached near the spearhead, and a large helmet with a penguin bill-like visor, gnu horns, and a row of gear teeth running down the middle. This design often incorporated logos from Linux-related projects, such as the KDE "K" stamped on her helmet, the GNOME footprint logo printed on her dress, and the names of different Linux bootloaders emblazoned on the spear's ribbons.

== Supporting characters ==
Because of heavy associations between operating systems and their supporting programs, such as anti-virus clients and Web browsers, many supporting characters have been created to personify the idiosyncrasies of these applications. Some examples are:

- Microsoft Bing: Nanako, Nanae, Nanao, Nanami, Nana
- Internet Explorer/Microsoft Edge: Inori Aizawa (IE-tan)
- Microsoft Silverlight: Hikaru Aizawa
- Microsoft Azure: Claudia Madobe
- Mozilla Firefox: Firefox-tan
- Mozilla Thunderbird: Thunderbird-tan

== Critical reception ==
Wired News rated OS-tan among the "Lamest Technology Mascots Ever", yet "strangely compelling".

The influence of OS-tan would spark similar phenomena such as Console-tan, based on video game consoles.

== See also ==
- CG artwork
- Mecha Musume
- Moe anthropomorphism
- List of computing mascots
