= Japanese Studies (journal) =

Academic journal of Japan-related research

- Discipline: Japanese studies
- Language: English
- Edited by: Carolyn S. Stevens

Publication details
- History: 1981–present
- Publisher: Routledge
- Frequency: Triannual
- Impact factor: 0.4 (2024)

Standard abbreviations
- ISO 4: Jpn. Stud.

Indexing
- ISSN: 1037-1397 (print); 1469-9338 (web)
- OCLC no.: 36052980

Links
- Journal homepage; Online access; Online archive; Journal page at association website

Japanese Studies is a triannual peer-reviewed academic journal publishing research on Japan. It is the official journal of the Japanese Studies Association of Australia. The editor-in-chief is Carolyn S. Stevens (Monash University). The journal was established in 1981 and is published by Routledge on behalf of the association. According to the Journal Citation Reports, the journal has a 2024 impact factor of 0.4.
