= Afghanis-tan =

Japanese yonkoma manga, 2003–2005

- Japanese edition cover

あふがにすタン (Afuganisu-tan)
- Genre: Yonkoma
- Manga
- Written by: Timaking (ちまきing)
- Published by: Sansai Books
- Magazine: Online
- Original run: October 2003 – February 2005
- Volumes: 1

Afghanis-tan (あふがにすタン, Afuganisu-tan) is a Japanese yonkoma manga by Timaking (ちまきing).

The manga was initially published online as a webcomic before being published as a manga book by Sansai Books from 2003 to 2005. The Japanese version was translated into English online by fans in 2005.

Afghanis-tan illustrates events in the modern history of Afghanistan and its neighboring countries over twenty-nine episodes and one appendix. Each episode is a four-panel story in which the nation of Afghanistan and other countries are anthropomorphized as young girls. Each episode is accompanied by a "memo", a short piece of text that explains historical events and context in a politically-neutral way.

== See also ==
- Hetalia: Axis Powers
- Polandball
