= List of honorifics =

List of honorifics may refer to:

- English honorifics
- French honorifics
- Canadian honorifics
- Chinese honorifics
- Filipino styles and honorifics
- German honorifics
- Hokkien honorifics
- Honorific nicknames in popular music
- Indian honorifics
- Indonesian honorifics
- Italian honorifics
- Japanese honorifics
- Javanese language#Registers
- Korean honorifics
- List of Latin honorifics
- Malay styles and titles
- Nahuatl honorifics
- Russian forms of addressing
- Sinhala honorifics
- Slavic honorifics
- Tamil honorifics
- Thai honorifics
