= Emeritus =

Honorary title for retired professionals

An emeritus (/əˈmɛrɪtəs/) or emerita (/əˈmɛrɪtə/) (Note: feminine emerita or emeritus; plural emeriti (masc.) or emeritae (fem.); abbreviation emer.) is an honorary title granted to someone who retires from a position of distinction, most commonly an academic faculty position, but is allowed to continue using the previous title, as in "professor emeritus". The term emeritus does not necessarily signify a person has relinquished all the duties of their former position. They may be obligated or allowed to perform some tasks, though usually in a more limited capacity than full-time.

The term is occasionally conferred automatically upon all persons who retire at a given rank, but in others, it remains a mark of distinguished performance (usually in the area of research) awarded selectively on retirement. It is also used when a person of distinction in a profession retires or hands over the position, enabling their former rank to be retained in their title.

In descriptions of deceased professors emeriti listed at U.S. universities, the title emeritus is replaced by an indication of the years of their appointments, except in obituaries, where it may be used to indicate their status at the time of death.

== Etymology ==
Emeritus (past participle of Latin emerere, meaning 'complete one's service') is a compound of the Latin prefix e- (variant of ex-) meaning 'out of, from' and merere (source of 'merit') meaning 'to serve, earn'. The word is attested since the early 17th century with the meaning 'having served out one's time, having done sufficient service'. The Latin feminine equivalent, emerita (/ə.ˈmɛ.rɪ.tə/), is also sometimes used, although in English the word emeritus is often unmarked for gender. The gender-neutral title Professor Emerit for men and women is available at some universities.

In most systems and institutions, the rank is bestowed on all professors who have retired in good standing, while at others, it needs a special act or vote.

== Other uses ==
=== Religion ===
When a diocesan bishop or auxiliary bishop retires, the word emeritus is added to their former title, i.e., "Archbishop Emeritus of ...". The term "Bishop Emeritus" of a particular see can apply to several people, if the first lives long enough. The title was applied to the Bishop of Rome, Pope Emeritus Benedict XVI, on his retirement. In Community of Christ, the status of emeritus is occasionally granted to senior officials upon retirement.

In Judaism, emeritus is often a title granted to long-serving rabbis of synagogues or other Jewish institutions. In some cases, the title is also granted to chazzans or cantors.

=== Business ===
It is also used in business and nonprofit organizations to denote perpetual status of the founder of an organization or individuals who made significant contributions to the institution. Phil Knight, for example, is the co-founder of Nike, and after decades of being the CEO, he is now the chairman emeritus of the company.

=== Government ===
Since 2001, the honorary title of president pro tempore emeritus has been given to a senator of the minority party who has previously served as president pro tempore of the United States Senate.

Following her decision to retire from Democratic leadership, the House Steering and Policy Committee voted to grant Nancy Pelosi the title of Speaker Emerita in recognition of her service as Speaker of the House, while newly elected Speaker Mike Johnson referred to his ousted predecessor Kevin McCarthy as Speaker Emeritus.

Cabinet of Singapore also adopted the use of emeritus and so far it has been conferred to Senior Minister of Singapore Goh Chok Tong in 2011, when he and then-Minister Mentor Lee Kuan Yew both stepped down from the upcoming cabinet as part of the party's renewal process. Goh retired from politics in 2020, though his title as an emeritus was kept intact.

== See also ==
- List of academic ranks
- Daijō Tennō – Title for a retired emperor of Japan, which is translated as "Emperor Emeritus" in modern times.
- President pro tempore emeritus of the United States Senate – Second-highest-ranking official of the US Senate
- Taishang Huang – Ancient Chinese title of a retired emperor

== Sources ==
- "Emeritus", New Oxford American Dictionary (2nd edition), 2005.
- "Emeritus", Australian Concise Oxford Dictionary (3rd edition), 1997.
