= Misc =

Misc or MISC may refer to:

- Misc, written abbreviation for miscellaneous, often used in programs
- Misc (title), a gender neutral title
- misc.*, one of the Big 8 (Usenet) hierarchies
- MISC Berhad, or Malaysia International Shipping Corporation
- Minimal instruction set computer, a processor architecture
- Moi International Sports Centre, in Kasarani, Kenya
- TCD Misc. Magazine
- Multisystem inflammatory syndrome in children, a post-infectious disease associated with COVID-19
- Malabar Independent Syrian Church
