= Nahuatl honorifics =

Nahuatl honorifics refers to the set of linguistic elements and morphological systems found in the Nahuatl group of related languages and dialects, that are used to mark degrees of respect and relative social standing and distance for the speaker and subject(s) of discourse. These systems of honorific or reverential address, have been noted for both the 16th-century contact-era recorded form (Classical Nahuatl) and its living modern-day descendant Nahuatl dialects and speech communities. The system of honorifics observed for Nahuatl languages is a highly complex one, employing both free and bound morphemes that may attach to nouns, verbs, postpositions and other grammatical elements, providing a gradation of reverential address options whose use is governed by cultural and social norms within the Nahuatl speech community. Linguists have identified at least four distinct levels of honorific address within and among Nahuatl languages and dialects.

The four levels of honor or reverence include an “intimate” or “subordinate”

1. Level I, a “neutral,” “distant” or “first respect”
2. Level II, a “reverential”
3. Level III, and finally, the sacred, “ultra-reverential” compadrazgo
4. Level IV used in religious contexts.

Compadres, or godparents, who are established as kin through religious ritual, are the only members of the community to whom this highest level of reverence is applied. The morphemes used to express these four levels of honor are a linguistic manifestation of the social structure and politeness strategies of Nahuatl culture. Factors such as age, kinship, occupation, fluency in Nahuatl, and the cultural value of compadrazgo are primary in determining the level of reverence one merits. The four levels of honor are supported by a framework of cultural, and especially religious, beliefs and values. Honorific usage also varies slightly among the dialects, a variation closely tied to socioeconomic status, respect for tradition, indigenous solidarity, and a region’s degree of contact with other speech communities.

== See also ==
- Honorifics (linguistics)
- Honorific speech in Japanese
- Korean honorifics
- Thai honorifics
