= Hokkein =

Hokkein may refer to:

- Hoklo people, a Han Chinese sub-ethnic group
- Hokkien, the language spoken by the Hoklo
