= Hokkien honorifics =

Courtesy form of address

The Hokkien language uses a broad array of honorific suffixes or prefixes for addressing or referring to people. Most are suffixes. Honorifics are often non-gender-neutral; some imply a feminine context (such as sió-chiá) while others imply a masculine one (such as sian-siⁿ), and still others imply both.

== Common honorifics ==
=== Sian-siⁿ ===
Sian-siⁿ (先生), also pronounced sian-seⁿ in some Hokkien dialects, is the most commonplace male honorific and is a title of respect typically used between equals of any age. Sian-siⁿ is also used to refer to or address authority figures, especially teachers and doctors. The usage is also seen in other East Asian languages (see sensei).

=== Sió-chiá ===
Sió-chiá (小姐) is a term for an unmarried woman.

== Familial honorifics ==
Honorifics for family members have two different forms in Hokkien.

For a younger family member to call an elder one, the prefixes a- (阿) or chó͘- (祖) is used as the honorific. The usage may also be used to mention one's own family members. For examples:

Base noun		Honorific		English translation
Pe̍h-ōe-jī	Hàn-jī	Pe̍h-ōe-jī	Hàn-jī	English translation
kong	公	chó͘-kong	祖公	great grandfather
má	媽	chó͘-má	祖媽	great grandmother
kong	公	a-kong	阿公	grandfather
má	媽	a-má	阿媽	grandmother
pah	爸	a-pah	阿爸	father
bú / bó	母	a-bú / a-bó	阿母	mother
hiaⁿ	兄	a-hiaⁿ	阿兄	elder brother
ché / chí	姊	a-ché / a-chí	阿姊	elder sister

Note that it is very impolite to say lín chó͘-má (your great grandma) in some situations; it may be regarded as a rude singular first personal pronoun for the female speakers. (See Hokkien pronouns)

For someone to mention his or her own parents to a non-family-member, the prefix lāu- (老) is sometimes used to replace the prefix a- as the honorific.

Base noun		Honorific		English translation
Pe̍h-ōe-jī	Hàn-jī	Pe̍h-ōe-jī	Hàn-jī	English translation
pē	父	lāu-pē	老父	father
bú / bó	母	lāu-bú / lāu-bó	老母	mother

For someone to mention his or her own elder family members to a non-family-member, the prefix án- (俺), which literally means my, is also used in some areas. For examples:

Base noun		Honorific		English translation
Pe̍h-ōe-jī	Hàn-jī	Pe̍h-ōe-jī	Hàn-jī	English translation
má	媽	án-má	俺媽	grandmother
niâ	娘	án-niâ	俺娘	mother
ko͘	姑	án-ko͘	俺姑	aunt

== Occupation-related honorifics ==
=== Sai ===
Similar to suffix -su and -sū mentioned later, the suffix -sai (師) is used for some people with skillful techniques; for example, kûn-thâu-sai (拳頭師) for martial artists, phah-thih-á-sai (拍鐵仔師) for blacksmiths, phah-chio̍h-sai (拍石師) for masons, thô͘-chúi-sai (塗水師) for plasterers, chóng-phò͘-sai (總舖師) for chefs and sai-kōng (師公) for a daoshi.

=== Su ===
Many people with different occupations get their own honorifics with a suffix -su (師) in Hokkien. For example, i-su (醫師) for doctors, io̍h-chè-su (藥劑師) for pharmacists, kang-têng-su (工程師) for engineers, lāu-su (老師) for teachers, and lu̍t-su (律師) for lawyers.

=== Sū ===
For academic degrees, the titles are suffixed with -sū (士); for examples, phok-sū (博士) for doctorate degree, se̍k-sū (碩士) for master's degree, and ha̍k-sū (學士) for bachelor's degree. In addition, some occupations have their honorifics with a suffix -sū; for example, hō͘-sū (護士) for nurses, piān-sū (辯士) for voice-overs, and chō͘-sán-sū (助產士) for midwives.

== Royal and official honorifics ==
- Pē-hā (陛下) is used for sovereign royalty, similar to "Majesty" in English.
- Tiān-hā (殿下) is used for non-sovereign royalty, similar to "Highness" in English.
- Chóng-thóng (總統) means president.
- Chóng-lí (總理) means prime minister.
- Koh-hā (閣下) means "Your Excellency", and is used for heads of state (except for those addressed by Pē-hā or Tiān-hā), heads of government, ministers.

== Other honorifics ==
Pe̍h-ōe-jī	Hàn-jī	Literal meaning	Gender	Usage	Examples	Notes
chí / ché	姊	elder sister	female	suffix	Mary-chí	The honorific chí or ché is usually added right after one's name, and it shows a "sister-like" respect.
hiaⁿ	兄	elder brother	male	suffix	John-hiaⁿ	The honorific hiaⁿ is usually added right after one's name, and it shows a "brother-like" respect.
iâ	爺	father, master	male	suffix	Sêng-hông-iâ (城隍爺), lāu-iâ (老爺), siàu-iâ (少爺)	The honorific iâ is usually used for gods, deities, or honorable people.
koaⁿ	倌		neutral	suffix	sin-lông-koaⁿ (新郎倌) means bridegroom	
kùi	貴	noble	neutral	prefix	kùi-keⁿ (貴庚) for asking for someone's age; kùi-sèⁿ (貴姓) for asking for someone's surname	
lán	咱	you	neutral	pronoun	Lán tó-ūi beh chhōe? (Who is this on the phone?)	The Hokkien pronoun lán usually means "we" (inclusive), but it is often used to ask for one's information on telephone conversation politely.
lāu	老	old, experienced	male, sometimes female	prefix	lāu-su (老師) means teacher.; lāu-sai-hū (老師傅) means experienced technician.; lāu-seng (老生) means experienced elders.	The prefix lāu may sometimes be impolite or even rude to call someone because the word lāu means "old"; for example, lāu-hòe-á (老歲仔) for old person or lāu-kâu (老猴), which literally means "old monkey", for old man or husband. The prefix lāu doesn't always imply respect.
sòe	歲	year	neutral		bān-sòe (萬歲) for addressing emperor; chhian-sòe (千歲) for addressing empress	
thâu	頭	the head	neutral	prefix or suffix	thâu-lâng (頭儂) means master; thâu-ke (頭家) means employer or husband; kang-thâu (工頭) means foreman	In Hokkien-language, the noun thâu originally means "head", and is later extended to the "leader" or the "master".

=== Other news ===
In 2018, the Chinese military released a video aimed at Taiwan recorded in Hokkien, a language widely discouraged in China.

== See also ==
- Chinese honorifics
- Japanese honorifics
- Korean honorifics
