= Honorific =

Title that conveys position or rank

An honorific is a title that conveys esteem, courtesy, or respect for position or rank when used in addressing or referring to a person. It is also often conflated with systems of honorific speech in linguistics, which are grammatical or morphological ways of encoding the relative social status of speakers. Honorifics can be used as prefixes or suffixes depending on the appropriate occasion and presentation in accordance with style and customs. Sometimes, the term "honorific" is used in a more specific sense, to refer to an honorary academic title.

Typically, honorifics are used as a style in the grammatical third person (e.g., His Holiness), and as a form of address in the second person (e.g., Your Majesty). Some languages have anti-honorific (despective or humilific) first person forms (expressions such as "your most humble servant" or "this unworthy person") whose effect is to enhance the relative honor accorded to the person addressed; these are nowadays used only in formal written correspondence.

== Modern English honorifics ==
The most common honorifics in modern English are usually placed immediately before a person's name. Honorifics used (both as style and as form of address) include, in the case of a man, "Mr." (irrespective of marital status), and, in the case of a woman, previously either of two depending on marital status: "Miss" if unmarried and "Mrs." if married, widowed, or divorced; more recently, a third, "Ms.", became the more prevalent norm, mainly owing to the desire to avoid identifying women by their marital status. Further considerations regarding identifying people by gender currently are raised with varying prevalence and details; in some environments, honorifics such as Mx., Ind. or Misc. may be used so as not to identify people by gender. In some environments, the honorific "Mstr." may be used for a boy who has not yet entered adult society; similar to this, "Miss" may be considered appropriate for a girl but inappropriate for a woman (but unless parallel to "Mstr." the reasoning is not explicit). All the above terms but "Miss" are written as abbreviations—most were originally abbreviations (e.g., from "Mister", "Mistress"), others may be considered as coined to directly parallel them for consistency. Abbreviations that include the initial and final letters (a type of contraction) are typically written in most English dialects (modern U.K. English, Australian English, South African English, amongst many others) without full stops (periods), but in U.S. English and Canadian English the period is often still used.

Other honorifics may denote the honored person's occupation, for instance "Doctor" (Dr), "Esquire" (Esq, as a post nominal), "Captain", "Coach", "Officer", "The Reverend" (The Rev) (for some Christian clergy) or "Father" (Fr) (for a Catholic, Eastern Orthodox, Oriental Orthodox, or Anglican Christian priest), "Rabbi" (for certain Jewish clergy), or Professor. (Note: U.S./Canadian usage of professor differs from most of the rest of the English-speaking world. See Professor for details.)

Holders of an academic doctorate, such as a Ph.D., are addressed as "Doctor" (abbreviated Dr).

Some honorifics act as complete replacements for a name, as "Sir" or "Ma'am", or "Your Honour/Honor". Subordinates will often use honorifics as punctuation before asking a superior a question or after responding to an order: "Yes, sir" or even "Sir, yes, sir."

Similarly, a monarch ranking as a king/queen or emperor and his/her consort may be addressed as "Your Majesty", or referred to as "His/Her Majesty", "Their Majesties", etc. Note, however, that there is no customary honorific accorded to a female monarch's consort, as he is usually granted a specific style (eg His Royal Highness, Prince Philip). Monarchs below kingly rank are addressed as "Your/His/Her Highness", the exact rank being indicated by an appropriate modifier, e.g. "His Serene Highness" for a member of a princely dynasty, or "Her Grand Ducal Highness" for a member of a family that reigns over a grand duchy. Verbs with these honorifics as subject are conjugated in the third person (e.g. "you are going" vs. "Your Honour is going" or "Her Royal Highness is going".) Protocol for monarchs and aristocrats can be very complex, with no general rules — and offence can be caused by using a form that is not exactly correct. There are differences between "Your Highness" and "Your Royal Highness"; between "Princess Margaret" and "The Princess Margaret". All these are correct, but apply to people of subtly different rank. An example of a non-obvious style is "Her Majesty Queen Elizabeth The Queen Mother", which was an official style, but unique to one person.

Occupants of state and political office may be addressed with an honorific. A president may be addressed as Your Excellency or Mr/Madam President, a minister or secretary of state as "Your Excellency", "Minister", or Mr/Madam Secretary, etc. A prime minister may be addressed as "the Honorable" or "Prime Minister". In the UK, members of the Privy Council are addressed as "the Right Honourable ...". A member of Parliament or other legislative body may have particular honorifics: a member of a lower house is typically described member of a Senate, for example, may be addressed as "Senator". The etiquette varies and most countries have protocol specifying the honorifics to be used for its state, judicial, military and other officeholders.

Judges are often addressed as "Your Honour/Honor" when on the bench, the plural form is "Your Honours" and the style is "His/Her Honour". If the judge has a higher title, that may be the correct honorific to use, for example, for High Court Judges in England: "Your Lordship" or "My Lord". Members of the U.S. Supreme Court (as well as some state-level appellate judges) are addressed as "Justice".

In music, a distinguished conductor or virtuoso instrumentalist may be known as "Maestro".

In aviation, pilots in command of a larger civil aircraft are usually addressed as "Captain" plus their full name or surname. This tradition is slowly diminishing in the United States and most European Union countries. However, many countries, especially in Asia, follow this tradition and address airline pilots, military pilots, and flight instructors exclusively as "Captain" even outside of the professional environment. In addition, such countries' etiquette rules dictate that this title must be placed on all the official letters and social invitations, business cards, identification documents, etc. In the U.S., when addressing a pilot, common etiquette does not require the title "Captain" to be printed on official letters or invitations before the addressee's full name. However, this is optional (akin to "Esq." after an attorney's name, in the U.S.) and may be used where appropriate, especially when addressing airline pilots with many years of experience.

Former military officers are sometimes addressed by their last military rank, such as "Admiral", "Colonel", "General", etc. This is generally adopted only by those officers who served and at least obtained the rank equivalency of Major. In the U.S., veterans of all ranks who have served during wartime and were honorably discharged may 'bear the title' of the highest rank held, as codified in law, 10 USC 772e, both officer and enlisted. When such ranks are used in writing, the post-nominal "(Ret'd)" (a shortening of retired) is also added following the surname.

=== Examples ===
- Your Highness
- Your Holiness
- Your Honor
- Your Grace
- Your Lordship
- Your Majesty
- Your Worship

== Honorifics in other languages and cultures ==
=== Culturally specific usage ===
- Australian honorifics
- Canadian honorifics
- Chinese honorifics
- Filipino honorifics
- French honorifics
- German honorifics
- Honorifics in Judaism
- Indian honorifics
- Islamic honorifics
- Japanese honorifics
- Korean honorifics
- Kunya (Arabic)
- Thai royal ranks and titles
- Vietnamese honorifics

=== Africa ===
In areas of East Africa where the Bantu language Swahili is spoken, mzee is frequently used for an elder to denote respect by younger speakers. It is used in direct conversation and used in referring to someone in the third person. Other honorifics include mukubwa (for ministers, employers, and authorities), dada/kaka (for peers, friends, colleagues), and mama/baba (for parents and grandparents). Additionally, some Arabic loanwords are used in coastal regions as honorifics, too, such as ami (paternal uncle) and haloo (maternal aunt), the familial roles for which are more often described elsewhere in the Swahili-speaking world as baba mkubwa/mdogo (older/younger father) or mama mkubwa/mdogo (older/younger mother). Furthermore, parents are oftentimes addressed by a combination of their parental title and the name of a child, e.g. Baba Zekiyah refers to the father of Zekiyah. While Swahili is Bantu, it is highly influenced by Arabic and Hindi languages and cultures. Babu is a prefix honorific used with elders, similar to mzee, but may also mean grandfather. Other prefix honorifics are ndugu, for brother or a close male friend, and dada for a sister or close female friend; thus, John and Jane would be Ndugu John and Dada Jane, respectively.

Amongst the Akan ethnic groups of West Africa's Ghana, the word nana is used as an aristocratic pre-nominal by chiefs and elders alike.

In Yorubaland, also in West Africa, the word ogbeni is used as a synonym for the English "mister". Titled members of the region's aristocracy are therefore called oloye instead, this being the word for "chief". Although the former of the two titles is only used by men, aristocrats of either gender are addressed using the latter of them.

=== Europe and former European colonies ===
==== Ancient Rome ====
Some honorifics used by Ancient Romans, such as Augustus, turned into titles over time.

==== Italy ====
Italian honorifics are usually limited to formal situations. Professional titles like Ingegnere (engineer) are often substituted for the ordinary Signore / Signora (mister or Mrs.), while Dottore or Dottoressa (doctor) is used freely for any graduate of a university. For college professors on academic settings, the honorifics Professore or Professoressa prevail over Dottore or Dottoressa. Masculine honorifics lose their e ending when juxtaposed to a surname: e.g., Dottor Rossi, Cardinal Martini, Ragionier Fantozzi. Verbs are conjugated in the third person singular (as opposed to the second person singular) when addressing someone using an honorific and the formal pronoun Lei (with a capital L) is used instead of the informal tu.

For members of the clergy and historically also for any member of low nobility, Don (feminine Donna) followed by given name is the usual form of address (similar to how English would say Father John for a priest or Sir James for a petty noble). This in turn gave rise to the address of mafia gangsters as Don followed by either the given name or the family name as a sign of utmost reverence.

==== Spanish-speaking cultures ====
Spanish has a number of honorific forms that may be used with or as substitutes for names, such as señor or caballero ("Mr.", "Sir", "Gentleman"); señora ("Madam", "Mrs.", "Lady", "ma'am") and señorita ("Miss", "young lady"); licenciado for a person with bachelor's or a professional degree (e.g., attorneys and engineers); maestro for a teacher, master mechanic, or person with a master's degree; doctor ("doctor"); etc. Also used is don (male) or doña (female) for people of rank or, in some Latin American countries (e.g., Puerto Rico), for any senior citizen. In some Latin American countries, like Colombia, "Doctor" is used for any respected figure regardless of whether they have a doctoral degree (for instance Colombian presidents are often referred to as Doctor ___); likewise "Maestro" is used for artistic masters, especially painters.

Additionally, older people and those with whom one would speak respectfully (e.g., one's boss or teacher), are often addressed as usted, abbreviated ud., a formal/respectful way of saying "you" (e.g. Dra. Polo, ¿cómo está usted? Dr. Polo, how are you?). The word usted historically comes from the honorific title vuestra merced (literally "your mercy"). This formal you is accompanied by verb conjugation that is different from the informal you tú. Intimate friends and relatives are addressed as tú. In some regions, addressing a relative stranger as tú can be considered disrespectful or provocative, except when it is directed to a person notably younger than the speaker, or in an especially informal context.

=== Subcontinental Asia ===
==== India ====
Indian honorifics abound, covering formal and informal relationships for commercial, generational, social, and spiritual links. Honorifics may be prefix, suffix, or replacement types. There are many variations.

- Prefix type: The most common honorifics in India are usually placed immediately before the name of the subject. Honorifics which can be used of any adult of the appropriate sex include Sri (also Romanised as Shri, abbreviation of Sriman), Smt (abbreviation of Srimati), and Kum (abbreviation of Kumari). In Punjab, Sardar is used for Sikh men and Sardarni for Sikh women. In Tamil, Thiru (abbreviation of Thiruvalar for men) and Thirumathi (for women) are used. In Telugu, Chi (abbreviation of 'chiranjeevi') is used for younger men and Chi.La.Sou (Chiranjeevini Lakshmi Soubhagyavathi) is prefixed for the names of younger women. In India, honorifics mostly come prior to the name of object.
- Replacement type: Some honorifics, like Bhavān or Bhavatī, act as complete replacements for a name. For example, in Gujarati, for an uncle who is your mother's brother, the replacement honorific maama (long "a" then short "a") is used, and a male friend will often earn the suffix honorific of bhai.
- Suffix type:
  - The traditional Hindi honorific is the suffix -ji. For example, M.K. Gandhi (the Mahatma) was often referred to as Gandhi-ji. (Hindi, like many languages, distinguishes between pronouns for persons older in age or status. Such a person is referred as aap; a person of same status is called tum (both translating as "you" in English, but similar in principle to the vous/tu distinction in French or the usted/tú distinction in Spanish). A similar distinction exists for third person pronouns. When honorifics are attached in Hindi, the verb matches the plural case.)
  - The traditional Bengali honorific for ordinary men is the suffix Babu (বাবু), used with the person's given (first) name. Thus, Shubhash Basu would be Shubhash-Babu. For men with whom one has a more formal relationship, the suffix Moshai (মশাই) (mohashoi (মহাশয়)) is used with the person's family (last) name. Thus, Shubhash Basu would be Basu-Moshai.
  - The traditional Kannada honorific is the suffix -avaru. For example, Visveswariah was referred to as Visveswariah-avaru.
  - The traditional Marathi honorific is the suffix -rao. For example, Madhav Scindia was referred to as Madhav-rao.
  - The traditional Mizo honorific for men and women are the prefix Pu and Pi respectively. For example, Pu Laldenga or Pi Ropuiliani. Additionally, the prefix U may be used for elder siblings.
  - The traditional Tamil honorific is the prefix Thiru/Tiru (meaning "sacred") which is used to address adult males and is often a part of many city names (e.g Tiruvannamalai). Another common honorific is Selvan, meaning "master", which is used to address unmarried men. Its female equivalent is Selvi ("Miss").
  - The traditional Telugu honorific is the suffix Garu. Thus, Potti Sriramulu would be Potti Sriramulu Garu.

==== Pakistan ====
Pakistan has numerous honorific forms that may be used with or as a substitute for names. The most common honorifics in Pakistan are usually placed immediately before the name of the subject or immediately after the subject. There are many variations across Pakistan.

- Prefix type: The traditional Urdu honorific in Pakistan for a man is the prefix Mohtaram. For example, Syed Mohammad Jahangir would become Mohtaram Syed Mohammad Jahangir. The traditional Urdu honorific in Pakistan for a woman is the prefix Mohtarma. For example, Shamim Ara would become Mohtarma Shamim Ara. These prefixes are, however, rarely used in formal and informal conversations and are almost entirely used as a title given to a national figure or when writing applications or letters.
- Suffix type: The traditional Urdu honorific in Pakistan for a man is the suffix Sahab. For example, Syed Zaki Ahmed would become Syed Zaki Ahmed Sahab. The traditional Urdu honorific in Pakistan for a woman is the suffix Sahiba; for instance, Shamim Ara would become Shamim Ara Sahiba.
- Bibi/Begum may be used as both a Prefix and Suffix for an honorable lady or even a spouse. Historically the term Begum was used to refer to a Muslim woman of high rank equivalent of Mrs. whereas Bibi can also serve as the equivalent of Miss or Mrs.
- Mian or miyan is an honorific commonly used to refer to any man in general. Historically the term was used to indicate a king or a prince under the suzerainty of the Mughal emperor.
- Hazrat is used before the names of religious leaders and scholars.
- Hajji is used before the name of individuals who have completed Hajj
- Sir and Ma'am/Madam have become increasingly common in formal professional settings. Baji/Appa/Aapi (sister), Bhai (brother), Uncle (male elder), Auntie (female elder) or Khaala (sister) are used in vernacular Urdu and non-professional settings. These honorifics are usually said without the name of the individual. If specification is required, they are more regularly used as suffixes than prefixes (though both are used).

=== Persian-speaking world ===
Honorifics and forms of address in the Persian-speaking world have historically reflected distinctions of rank, profession, religious status, age, kinship and social distance. In Persian sources a distinction can be made between alqāb (لقب‌ها), formal or descriptive titles often attached to a person's name, and ʿanāwīn (عنوان‌ها), forms of address and styles used in correspondence and speech. In traditional Persian correspondence, a full form of address could combine the addressee's rank, personal name, honorific titles, complimentary epithets and prayers appropriate to his or her status.

==== Iran ====
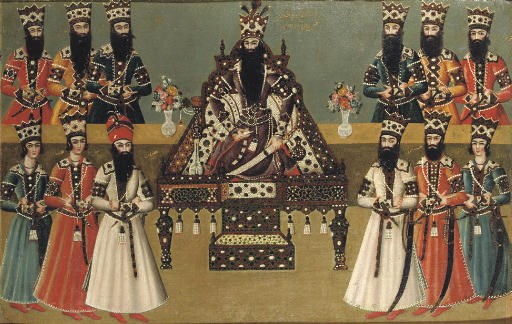
Fath-Ali Shah Qajar and his sons, c. 1815. Persian honorifics and forms of address historically reflected elaborate distinctions of royal, administrative and social rank.

The use of formal titles in Iran predates Islam. Ancient and late-antique Iranian rulers employed elaborate royal titulature, and the Sasanians used forms such as šāhān šāh ("king of kings"). From the reign of Shapur I, the royal style included "King of Kings of Iranians and non-Iranians". Religious and administrative ranks also developed their own titles; Middle Persian ērbed and mōbad, for example, were used for learned and senior Zoroastrian priests and survive in later Zoroastrian usage. The Zoroastrian term ašō, meaning "righteous" or "holy", is derived from Avestan ašavan and occurs in later Zoroastrian terminology and devotional usage.

After the Islamic conquest, Persian forms of address absorbed large numbers of Arabic and Turco-Mongol titles. Religious or genealogical designations such as Sayyid, Mir, Sheikh, Molla and Akhund, pilgrimage titles such as Hajji, Karbala'i and Mashhadi, and social titles such as Khan, Mirza, Aqa and Khanom became common. The position of a title could itself convey meaning: Mirza before a name commonly denoted a man of letters or a secretary, whereas after a name it could identify a prince or royal descendant.

The Qajar period developed an especially elaborate hierarchy of forms of address. Princes could be styled Navvab-e Vālā, while ministers and senior officials were addressed with combinations based on janāb, such as janāb-e ašraf, janāb-e arfaʿ and janāb-e mostaṭāb. The monarch was surrounded by still more exalted styles and epithets, including expressions such as Qebla-ye ʿĀlam ("Pivot of the World"). Formal correspondence could add elaborate blessings and deferential formulas to the addressee's titles.

Most official civil and military honorific titles were abolished by law in 1925, but the Pahlavi dynasty retained a small royal hierarchy. The shah was formally styled Aʿlā-Ḥażrat-e Homāyun-e Šāhanšāh ("His Imperial Majesty the Shahanshah"), the queen ʿOlyā-Ḥażrat, immediate princes and princesses Vālā-Ḥażrat, and royal grandchildren Vālā-Gohar. Senior officials could be styled janāb, while military usage included honorific forms such as timsār for general officers.

In modern Iranian Persian, āqā ("Mr., sir") and khānom or bānu ("Mrs., Miss, madam") are among the most common general forms of respectful address. Professional, academic and religious titles such as doktor, ostād, mohandes, Hojjat al-Islam and Ayatollah may be used before a name or independently as forms of address. Persian politeness also extends beyond honorific titles proper through the system of taarof, in which deference may be conveyed by conventional expressions of humility, respect and hospitality.

==== Afghanistan ====
In Afghan Persian, respectful address similarly depends strongly on age, status and social relationship. First names alone are generally avoided when addressing elders and superiors, who may instead be referred to by kinship or official titles. Terms such as kākā ("paternal uncle"), māmā ("maternal uncle"), lālā ("elder brother") and bābā may therefore function beyond literal kinship relations. Official superiors are commonly addressed by their offices or titles.

A characteristic Afghan Persian form is the use of sāheb ("sir, respected person") after a personal name or title, as in Ahmad Sāheb or Molavi Sāheb. Janāb is also used to address an unfamiliar man respectfully, while jān can follow a person's name as a respectful as well as affectionate form. Khānom and bānu are used for women, and in more traditional usage bibi may accompany a woman's name.

==== Tajikistan ====
In Tajik Persian, kinship terminology likewise has an important honorific function. Aka (ака, "elder brother") is widely used as a respectful title for an older man and may precede a given name with the izafet construction, as in akai Ahmad. It therefore occupies some of the social space filled by āqā in Iranian Persian. Other kinship expressions may similarly extend to non-relatives.

Tajik also makes comparatively extensive use of the respectful second-person plural pronoun šumo (шумо). It is normally used between unrelated adults of different sexes, toward parents and grandparents, and more generally where age or social distance calls for respect. Third-person plural verb forms may likewise be used honorifically. These usages illustrate that, throughout the Persian-speaking world, honorific address is expressed not only through formal titles but also through pronouns, kinship terms and grammatical choices.

=== Turkey ===
Turkish honorifics generally follow the first name, especially if they refer to gender or particular social statuses (e.g. Name Bey [Mr.], Name Hanım [Ms.], Name Beyefendi [literally meaning "Lord Master"], Name Hanımefendi [literally meaning "Lady Master"], Name Hoca [teacher or cleric], Name Öğretmen [solely for teacher]), Name Agha [high official]. Such honorifics are used in both formal and informal situations. Another honorific is Sayın/Muhterem [esteemed], which precedes the surname or full name, and is not gender-specific. (e.g. Sayın/Muhterem Name Surname, or Sayın/Muhterem Surname). They are generally used in very formal situations.

=== Southeast and East Asia ===
==== China ====
Chinese honorifics (敬語; Jìngyǔ) and honorific language are words, word constructs, and expressions in the Chinese language that convey self-deprecation, social respect, politeness, or deference. During the ancient and imperial periods, Chinese honorifics varied greatly based on one's social status, but with the end of Imperial China, many of these distinctions fell out of favour due to the May Fourth Movement. As such, honorific usage today is mostly used in formal situations and business settings only. Although Chinese honorifics have simplified to a large degree, many classical constructs are still occasionally employed to convey formality, humility, politeness or respect. Honorific language in Chinese is achieved by using honorific or beautifying alternatives, prefixing or suffixing a word with a polite complement, or by dropping casual-sounding words.

In general, there are five distinct categories of honorific language:

- Respectful Language (敬辭; Jìngcí), which is used when referring to others to show deference and politeness.
- Humble Language (謙辭; Qiāncí), which is used when referring to oneself in a self-deprecating manner to show humbleness and humility.
- Indirect Language (婉辭; Wǎncí), which is the use of euphemisms or tactful language to approach sensitive topics and show respect.
- Courteous Language (客套語; Kètàoyǔ), which employs praising and laudatory words or phrases with the intent to flatter the addressee.
- Elegant Language (雅語; Yáyǔ), which employs elegant and beautiful expressions and words in lieu of more casual words and phrases to describe people, objects, actions or concepts. It is often used on occasions where casual language may be deemed inappropriate. Due to the lack of equivalent expressions in English, translated phrases often do not convey the same sense of beauty or elegance.

==== Japan ====
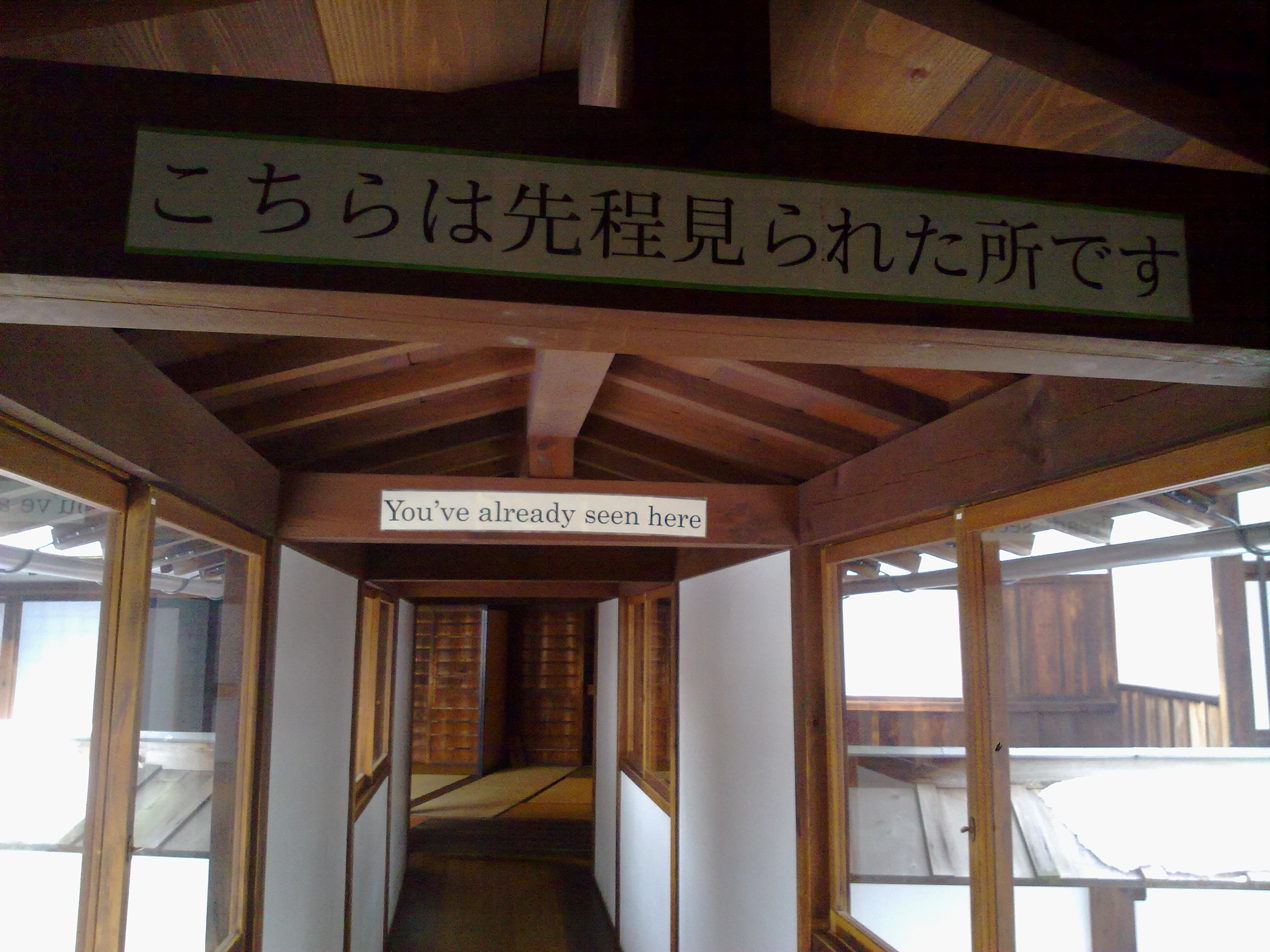
Mi-rareta (Sonkeigo)

In Japanese, honorifics called keigo (敬語) are used in everyday conversation. Most of them denote how the speaker's status relates to the one they are speaking to, and their use is mandatory in many formal and informal social situations. Japanese grammar, as a whole, tends to function on hierarchy; honorific stems are appended to verbs and many nouns, though primarily names, and in many cases one word may be exchanged for another word entirely with the same verb or noun meaning, but with different honorific connotations.

In Japan, there are three rough divisions of honorifics:

- Teineigo (丁寧語), the most popular keigo that is used in daily life, used as a formal and polite way of speaking to others in general. It is usually used when the speaker does not know the other person well. Under teineigo there is also bikago (美化語, beautiful, clean language) which is used when people simply want to speak in a polite way regardless of the age or class of the other person.
- Sonkeigo (尊敬語) is another type of keigo. It is used to make the person who is being spoken to in a higher position. It is mainly used at work and when speaking with teachers. In the past, this was a type of language that was formed based on the classes Japanese society used to have. Saikoukeigo (ja:最高敬語) is the highest sonkeigo that exists and it is used only for the Japanese emperor, his family members and equivalent foreign nobles.
- Kenjougo (謙譲語) lowers the position of the speaker or the subject of the conversation, and is primarily used at the workplace and in academia. This is also specifically used when the person is much older or in a higher position than the speaker, or often when one apologizes to someone else.

==== Javanese (Indonesia) ====
Indonesia's Javanese majority ethnicity has many honorifics. For example:

- Bang or Bung is a somewhat outdated, egalitarian term to refer to a brotherhood among men. Bang is Betawi language for Mas.
- Bapak and its contraction Pak meaning: "Sir", "Mister", or literally "Father".
- Bapak Cilik and its contraction Pak lik are used for a very familiar friend or sir; they literally meaning "small father" or a relative younger than one's father.
- Bapak Gede and its contraction Pak de are used for a big father, uncle, or relative older than one's father, meaning literally "Grand Sir".
- Bendara Raden Mas, Bendara Mas, or the contraction 'ndoro, meaning "Prince, flag-bearer 'His Highness'".
- Eyang Putera Kakung and its contraction Eyang Kakung meaning "grandfather", literally "Grand Sir".
- Eyang Puteri and its contraction Eyang meaning "grandmother", literally "Grand Lady".
- Ibu and its contraction Bu meaning: "Madam", "Ma'am", "Ms.", or "Mrs.", and literally meaning "Mother".
- I Gusti means "His or Her Royal Majesty".
- Kyai is an honorific used with a highly respected Muslim cleric (same as mullah in Iran and maulana in South Asia).
- Mbak yu and the more common mbak are derived from Surakarta court. Initially used to address unmarried women who are adolescents or of marriageable age, they are now used with all women, with no age or marital status connotation.
- Mbok is not an honorific; it denotes an older woman of very low status, in some cases a mother (Common Language).
- Raden Behi, contracted to Den Behi, means "Heir Apparent" and is now obsolete.
- Raden Emas and its contraction Mas denote: "Mr." among colleagues, friends, and others of slightly higher age or social status, meaning literally "Golden Son", "Lord", or "Heir Apparent".
- Raden Emas Behi, contracted to Mas Behi, means "Second Heir Apparent" and is now obsolete.

==== Korea ====
Korean honorifics are similar to Japanese honorifics, and similarly, their use is mandatory in many formal and informal social situations. Korean grammar as a whole tends to function on hierarchy; honorific stems are appended to verbs and some nouns, and in many cases, one word may be exchanged for another word entirely with the same verb or noun meaning, but with different honorific connotations. Linguists say there are six levels of honorifics in Korean but, in daily conversation, only four of them are widely used in contemporary Korean. Suffix -ssi-(씨) is used at most honorific verbs, but not always. It is considered very impolite and offensive not to use honorific sentences or words with someone who is older or has a higher social status, and most Koreans avoid using non-honorific sentences with someone they have met for the first time. In Korean, names, first or last, always precede a title, e.g., Park Sonsaengnim, Park Kwanjangnim, etc.

==== Malaysia, Brunei and Singapore ====
A complex system of Titles and honorifics is extensively used in the Malay language-speaking cultures in Brunei and Malaysia. In contrast Singapore, whose Malay royalty was abolished by the British colonial government in 1891, has adopted civic titles for its leaders. Being Muslim, Malay people address high-ranking religious scholars as tok imam (grandpa imam). Tok dalang is a honorific used to address a village leader.

==== Philippines ====
The usage of Filipino honorifics differs from person to person, though commonalities occur like the occasional insertion of the word po or ho in conversations, and their dependence on age-structured hierarchies. Though some have become obsolete, many are still widely used in order to denote respect, friendliness, or affection. Some new "honorifics", mainly used by teenagers, are experiencing surges in popularity.

The Filipino language has honorifics like Binibini/Ate ("Miss", "Big sister"), Ginang/Aling/Manang ("Mrs.", "Madam"), Ginoo/Mang/Manong/Kuya ("Mister", "Sir", "Big brother") that have roots in Chinese culture.

Depending on one's relation with the party being addressed, various honorifics may be used.

As such addressing a man who is older, has a higher rank at work or has a higher social standing, one may use Mr or Sir followed by the First/ last/ or full name. Addressing a woman in a similar situation as above one may use "Miss", or "Madam" and its contraction "Ma'am", followed by First/ last/ or full name. Older married women may prefer to be addressed as "Mrs." The use of Sir/Miss/Madam or Ma'am, followed by the first name, nickname, or surname is usually restricted to Filipino vernacular and social conversation, even in television and film. Despite this, non-Filipinos and naturalized Filipinos (such as expat students and professionals) also address older people in the Filipino way.

On a professional level, many use educational or occupational titles such as Architect, Engineer, Doctor, Attorney (often abbreviated as Arch./Archt./Ar., Engr., Dr. [or sometimes Dra. for female doctors], and Atty. respectively) on casual and even formal bases. Stricter etiquette systems frown upon this practise as a sign of Filipino professionals' obsession with flaunting their educational attainment and professional status. Despite this, some of their clients (especially non-Filipinos) would address them as simply Mr. or Mrs./Ms. followed by their surnames (or even Sir/Ma'am) in conversation. It is very rare, however, for a Filipino (especially those born and educated abroad) to address Filipino architects, engineers, and lawyers, even mentioning and referring to their names, the non-Philippine (i.e. international standard) way.

Even foreigners who work in the Philippines or naturalized Filipino citizens, including foreign spouses of Filipinos, who hold some of these titles and descriptions (especially as instructors in Philippine colleges and universities) are addressed in the same way as their Filipino counterparts, although it may sound awkward or unnatural to some language purists who argue that the basic titles or either Sir or Ma'am/Madam are to be employed for simplicity, as they are unnecessary when he or she is included in a list of wedding sponsors, or when their name appears in the list of officials of a country club or similar organization. They are uncalled for in public donations, religious activities, parents–teachers association events, athletic competitions, society pages of newspapers, and in any activity that has nothing to do with one's title or educational attainment. It is also acceptable to treat those titles and descriptions (except Doctor) as adjectival nouns (i.e., first letter not capitalized, e.g. architect (name)) instead.

Even though Doctor is really a title in standard English, the "created" titles Architect, Attorney, and Engineer (among other examples) are a result of vanity (titles herald achievement and success; they distinguish the title holder from the rest of society) and insecurity (the title holder's achievements and successes might be ignored unless announced to the public), even due to historical usage of pseudo-titles in newspapers when Filipinos first began writing in English.

Possible reasons are firstly, the fact the English taught to Filipinos was the "egalitarian" English of the New World, and that the Americans who colonized the Philippines encountered lowland societies that already used Iberian linguistic class markers like "Don" and "Doña." Secondly, the fundamental contradiction of the American colonial project. The Americans who occupied the Philippines justified their actions through the rhetoric of "benevolent assimilation". In other words, they were only subjugating Filipinos to teach them values like American egalitarianism, which is the opposite of colonial anti-equality. Thirdly, the power of American colonialism lies in its emphasis on education—an education that supposedly exposed Filipinos to the "wonders" of the American way of life. Through education, the American colonial state bred a new elite of Filipinos trained in a new, more "modern", American system. People with advanced degrees like law or engineering were at the apex of this system. Their prestige, as such, not only rested on their purported intelligence, but also their mastery of the colonizer's way of life. This, Lisandro Claudio suspects, is the source of the magical and superstitious attachment Filipinos have to attorneys, architects and engineers. The language they use is still haunted by their colonial experience. They linguistically privilege professionals because their colonizers made them value a certain kind of white-collar work. Again, even expatriate professionals in the Philippines were affected by these reasons when they resided and married a Filipino or were naturalized so it is not unusual for them to be addressed Filipino style.

==== Thailand ====
According to Thai translator, Mui Poopoksakul, "The Thai language is absolutely immediate in its indication of the speaker and addressee's places in the society and their relationship to each other. Thai has honorifics as well as what I like to call 'dishonorifics': it has a multitude of pronouns that are extremely nuanced—for example, there are so many ways to say 'I', and most of them already indicate the speaker's gender and often their age and societal standing relative to the person they are speaking to."

The most common Thai honorifics are used to differentiate age between friends, family, and peers. The most commonly used are:

- คุณ (RTGS: khun) (mid tone) is used the same way as "mister" or "Mrs" or "Miss". It is a formal way to refer to persons not overly familiar. It is also used as a pronoun for the word "you".
- พี่ (RTGS: phi) (falling tone) is used when speaking to or about an older sibling or friend. It is used for both men and women and can also be used when referring to oneself if one is older than the addressees.
- น้อง (RTGS: nong) (high tone) is the exact opposite of the above. It is use when speaking to or about a younger sibling or friend. It is used between both men and women and can also be used when referring to oneself if the person speaking is younger than the addressees. It could be used by a babysitter to address the child she takes care of.
- ครู (RTGS: khru) (mid tone) is used when addressing a teacher, translating literally to 'teacher'.
- อาจารย์ (RTGS: achan) (mid-tone both syllables) is used to address a professor. It is used much in the same way as khru however achan carries more prestige. It generally refers to someone who is a master in their field. Many Theravada Buddhist scholars and those who have dedicated their lives to Theravada Buddhism assume this title among their followers.
- พระ (RTGS: phra) (high tone) This is perhaps one of the highest honorifics in Thai culture. It is reserved for monks and priests. It is also allows for use when referring to a most revered place or object such as a temple or palace.

==== Vietnam ====
Honorifics in Vietnamese are more complex compared to those in Chinese, from which the origins of many of these pronouns can be traced, though many have since fallen out of usage or been replaced due to changing times. In Vietnamese, an honorific or pronoun used when referring to a person serves to define the degree of relationship between two people. Examples of such pronouns include chị ("older sister"), ông ("male elder"), and chú ("younger paternal uncle", i.e. a younger brother of one's father). The exclusive use of the Vietnamese words for "I" and "you" is considered informal and rude; rather, honorifics are used to refer to both oneself and others. These terms also tend to vary between provinces and regions.

As with East Asian convention, the surname is written before the given name: for example, in the name Hoang Khai Dinh, Hoang is the surname and Khai Dinh is the given name, with this ordering being observed in all formal contexts. However, placing the surname last has become increasingly common in order to accommodate Western conventions, for example on social media platforms such as Facebook. When addressing someone with a title such as "Mr" or "Mrs" (or a professional title such as "teacher" or "painter"), the given name is more commonly used rather than the surname (for example, "Mr Khai Dinh" rather than "Mr Hoang" to avoid confusion). This is partly because many Vietnamese people share the same surname; for instance, up to 40% share the surname Nguyễn.

=== Oceania ===
==== Fiji ====
Many honorifics are used within the culture of Fiji in Melanesia. The most commonly encountered of these is the chiefly title Ratu and its female equivalent Adi.

==== Māori (New Zealand) ====
Within New Zealand's Māori culture, the term ariki is used for a chief, with the Māori King or Queen addressed as arikinui (literally "big chief" or "high chief"). The term ariki and cognates such as 'aliki and ali'i are used in many other Polynesian nations for the same honorific purpose.

Respected elders within the country's iwi (tribes) are given the honorific kaumātua, literally meaning "without parents". This reflects that the person is likely to be in the oldest living generation, which in theory holds tribal knowledge. Male and female kaumātua are often referred to as koro and kuia respectively, terms which can be roughly translated as "grandfather" and "grandmother".

==== Pingelap and Pohnpei (Micronesia) ====
Pingelapese is a Micronesian language spoken on Pingelap Atoll and on Pohnpei, an island in the eastern Caroline Islands. Pingelapese does not employ many honorifics in speech. Their society is egalitarian in structure, most likely due to emigration reducing the population significantly. As such, there is no structured hierarchy to enforce the use of honorific speech, and the language can be classified as a commoners' language.

However, among the Micronesian languages, Pohnpeian is the only language that uses a thoroughly developed system of honorific speech, demonstrating that a highly structured hierarchical society was very important in Pohnpeian culture. There are multiple ways that Pohnpeian speakers show respect, such as royal language, which is used for the two highest-ranking chiefs. Respect honorifics are used with other superiors and people who are considered respected equals. There is also humiliative language, which is used to lower oneself below higher-ranking people, showing respect and reverence. This speech was lost in Pingelap when Pohnpeian speakers migrated to Pingelap Atoll and adapted their more casual way of speaking.

Even though the younger generation of Pingelapese speakers does not use honorific speech, elder speakers report being taught a form of "language of respect". This language was to be used to address elders and leaders in the community. Women were also told to use it towards their brothers and their children. Phrases could be made polite by adding the second person singular possessive suffix -mwi. Other ways to utilize honorific speech are by changing words entirely.

==== Wuvulu-Aua (Papua New Guinea) ====
Wuvulu-Aua does not normally incorporate honorifics as it is reserved for only the utmost respect. Originally without any honorifics, the semantics of pronouns change depending on the social context. In particular, the second person dual pronoun is used as an honorific address. The dual reference communicates that the second person is to be respected as two people. This honorific is typically reserved for in-laws. It is undocumented if any other honorifics exist beyond this one.

== Opposition and alternatives ==
People who have a strong sense of egalitarianism, such as Quakers and certain socialists, and others, eschew honorific titles. When addressing or referring to someone, they often use the person's name, an informal pronoun, or some other style implying social equality, such as "brother", "sister", "friend", or "comrade". This was also the practice in Revolutionary France and socialist countries which used Citoyen[ne] ("Citizen") as the manner of address. Also, some revolutionary governments abolished or banned the use of honorifics. One example is Turkey, which abolished honorifics and titles in 1934. Although it was abolished, titles such as "ağa" (for landlords) and "paşa" (for high-ranking military officials) continued to be used by people.

Feminist criticism of the use of separate honorifics for married and unmarried women (Mrs. and Miss) has led to some women adopting the honorific "Ms."

== See also ==
- List of titles
- List of honorifics
- Style (manner of address)
- The Honourable
- T-V distinction
