= List of Latin honorifics =

Below is a list of Latin honorifics and their abbreviations found in various texts, not necessarily Latin.

Certain honorifics may be prepended with the intensive prefix prae-, indicating very high degree, e.g., praepotens (very powerful), as well as used in superlative form, such as clarissimus, and even constructed by the combination of the two lexical devices, as in exellens (eminent, worthy) -> praexcellens -> praexellentissimum.

abbreviation	Latin	translation	usage and notes
c.	circumspectus	well-considered, prudent, remarkable	
c. mg.	circumspectus magister	well-considered master	
c. v.	circumspectus vir	well-considered man	
	clarissimus	most distinguished	Used for late Roman officials of "entry level" senatorial rank, for provincial governors and lesser officials of the comitatus
d.	discretus, discreta	from "discerno"; illustrious, distinguished	
d. v.	discretus vir	distinguished man	
e.	egregius	distinguished, eminent	In the meaning "superior" it was also used as a honorific title for emperors
e. mg.	egregius magister	distinguished master	
e. n.	egregius et nobilis	distinguished and noble	
e. v.	egregius vir	distinguished man	
f. v.	fidedignus vir	faithful, trustworthy man (fides + dignus, "worthy of faith")	
g.	generosus, generosa		
g. m.	generosus et magnificus, generosa et magnifica		
hon.	honestus, honesta		
h.	honorabilis		
h. mg.	honorabilis magister		
h. v.	honorabilis vir		
i.	illustris, illustrisimus, illustrisima		
i.v.	idoneus vir	proper man	
	inlustris	illustrious	Used for late Roman officials of the highest rank: praetorian and urban prefects, Masters of Soldiers, and members of the comitatus
m.	magnificus		
m. e. v.	magnificus et egregius vir		
m. v.	magnificus vir		
n.	nobilis		
n. e.	nobilis et egreguis		
n. g. v.	nobilis et generosus vir		
n. h.	nobilis et honestus/honesta		
n. mg.	nobilis magister		
n. s. mg.	nobilis et strenuus magister		
n. v.	nobilis vir		
p.	providus	prudent	
p. hon.	providus et honestus	prudent and honest	
p. v.	providus vir	prudent man	French prud'-homme is a calque of p.v.
p. i.	probus et idoneus	honest and proper	
pot. m.	potens vir et magnificus		
pr.	prudens		
pr. c.	prudens et circumspectus		
pr. v.	prudens vir		
r.	reverendus, reverendissimus		
rel.	religiosus, religiosa		
rel. v.	religiosus vir		
sap.	sapiens		
	spectabilis	respectable	Used for late Roman officials of middle rank, such as proconsuls, counts, dukes, and vicars
s. m.	spectabilis et magnificus		
str. m.	strenuus miles		
str. mg.	strenuus magister		
v.	venerabilis		
v. d.	venerabilis et deodevotus		
v. e.	venerabilis et egregius		
