= Hoklo people =

Han Chinese subgroup

Hoklo people: Hokkien; Southern Min
福佬人
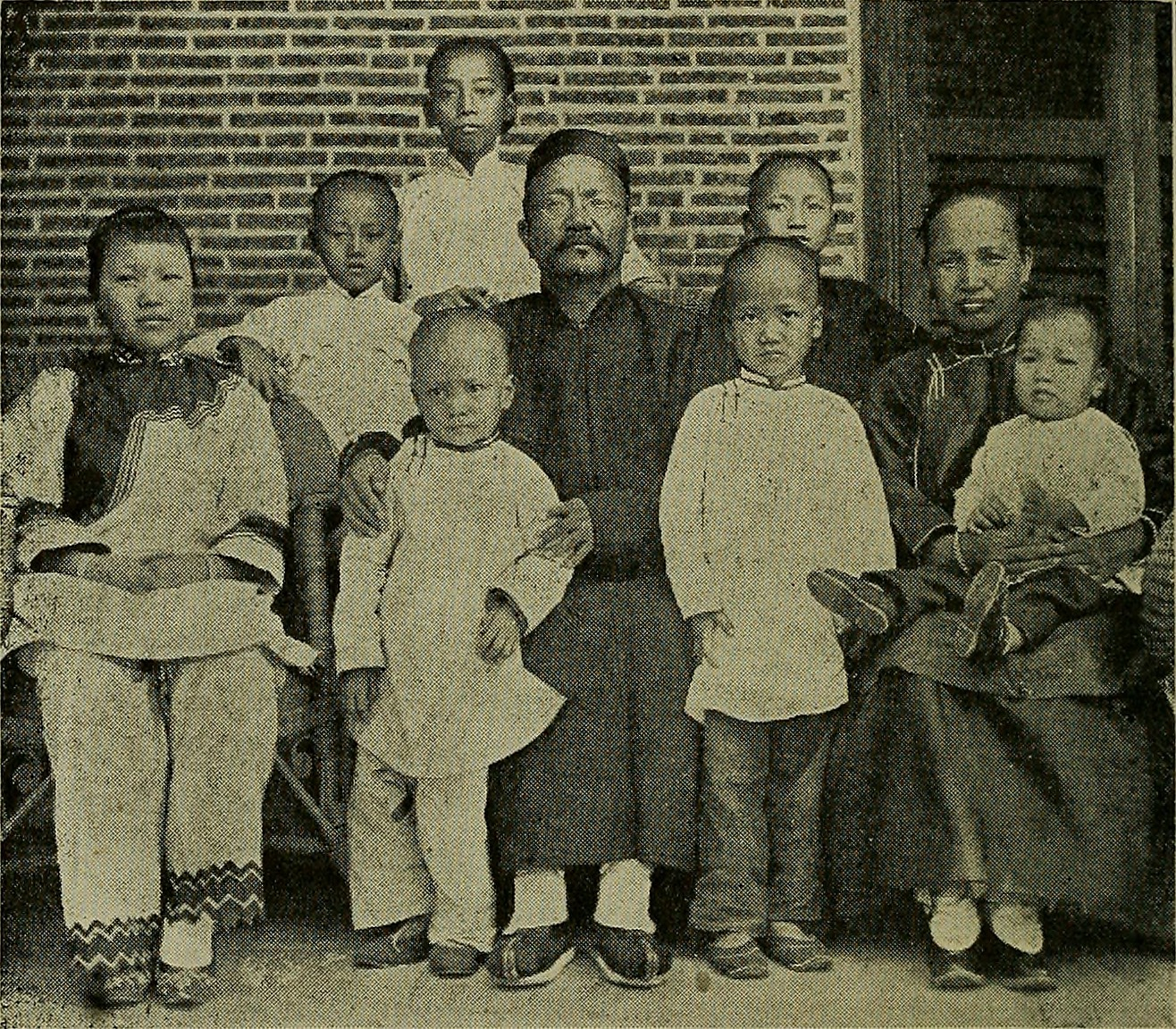
- A Hokkien family in Southern Fujian, 1910

Total population
- c. 60 million

Regions with significant populations
- China and Southeast Asia

Languages
- Hokkien; Standard Chinese; English; Indonesian; Malay; Filipino

Religion
- Chinese folk religion and others

Related ethnic groups
- Other Han Chinese, especially other Min Chinese speakers

The Hoklo people (Chinese: 福佬人; Pe̍h-ōe-jī: Ho̍h-ló-lâng) are a Han Chinese sub-ethnic group who speak Hokkien, a Southern Min language, or trace their ancestry to southeastern Fujian in China, and known by various related terms such as Banlam people (閩南人; Bân-lâm-lâng), Minnan people, Fujianese people or more commonly in Southeast Asia as the Hokkien people (福建人; Hok-kiàn-lâng). (Note: "Hokkien" is sometimes erroneously used to refer to all Fujianese people.) The Hokkien people are found in significant numbers in China, Taiwan, Hong Kong, Macau, Singapore, Malaysia, Philippines, Indonesia, Brunei, Myanmar, Thailand, Cambodia, and the United States. The Hokkien people have a distinct culture and architecture, including Hokkien shrines and temples with tilted sharp eaves, high and slanted top roofs, and finely detailed decorative inlays of wood and porcelain. The Hokkien language, which includes Taiwanese Hokkien, is the mainstream Southern Min, which is partially mutually intelligible to other Southern Min varieties such as Teochew, Zhongshan, Haklau, and Zhenan.

== Etymology ==
In Southern Fujian, the Hokkien speakers refer to themselves as Banlam people (閩南人; Bân-lâm-lâng) or generally speaking, Hokkien people (福建人; Hok-kiàn-lâng). In Mandarin, they also call themselves Minnan people (閩南人; 闽南人; Mǐnnán rén).

The term Hoklo is an exonym originating from Hakka or Cantonese that some Hokkien and Teochew speakers, particularly in Taiwan and China, borrowed from, since the term is not recognized by Hokkien speakers in Southeast Asia.

In Taiwan, the term "Hoklo" is usually used for the people. The term Holo (Ho̍h-ló) is also used to refer to Taiwanese Hokkien and those people who speak it.

There are several spellings for the word Hoklo (Ho̍h-ló / Hô-ló), either phonetic or based on folk etymologies:

- 河洛; Hô-lo̍k; 'Yellow River and Luo River' – a folk etymology emphasizing the people's purported long history originating from the area south of the Yellow River. First introduced by a Taiwanese linguist Wu Huai in 1957, and later popularized by the Taiwanese Ministry of Education for the pronunciation Hô-ló.
- 學佬; Ha̍k-láu; 'learned folk' – an orthographic borrowing from Hakka, where this word, pronounced Ho̍k-ló, is used to refer to Southern Min-speaking people (specifically the Teochew people). It was adopted by some Southern Min (particularly Haklau Min) speakers in Guangdong.
- 福佬; Hô-ló / Ho̍h-ló; 'Fujian folk' – a folk etymology emphasizing the people's native connection to Fujian.
- 鶴老; Ho̍h-ló; 'crane folk' – found in the 17th century Dictionario Hispanico Sinicum as the name for Hokkien-speaking people.

In the Philippines, Chinese Filipinos, most of whom are of ethnic Hokkien descent, usually generally refer to themselves as Lannang (咱儂; Lán-lâng / Lán-nâng / Nán-nâng; 'Our People') or sometimes more specifically Hokkien people (福建儂; Hok-kiàn-lâng).

In Malaysia and Singapore, Hokkien-speaking Chinese Malaysians and Singaporeans generally refer to themselves as Tng Lang (唐儂; Tn̂g-lâng; 'Tang People'), where those of Hokkien-speaking descent are more specifically known as Hokkien people (福建儂; Hok-kiàn-lâng).

In Indonesia, Hokkien-speaking Chinese Indonesians generally refer to themselves as Tionghoa (中華; Tiong-hôa; 'Central Chinese'), where those of ethnic Hokkien descent are more specifically known as Hokkien people (福建儂; Hok-kiàn-lâng).

== Genetics ==
In genomic studies, the Han Chinese populations in Fujian (i.e. the Hokkien people) cluster intermediately between the northern Sinitic populations and southern Tai-Kadai and Austronesian populations. This reflects the history of demic diffusion out of the Central Plains region and admixure with Southern tribal minorities.

Other studies deduce a close relation and common paternal ancestry between individuals from the Taihang mountain region of Henan, Fujian Minnan and Chaoshan based on common Y-chromosome patterns and higher prevalence of esophageal cancer, with Han Chinese males from the Taihang region of Henan being posited as the progenitor population for both Fujian Han (i.e. Hokkien people) and the Chaoshan Han (i.e. the Teochew people).

== Culture ==
=== Architecture ===
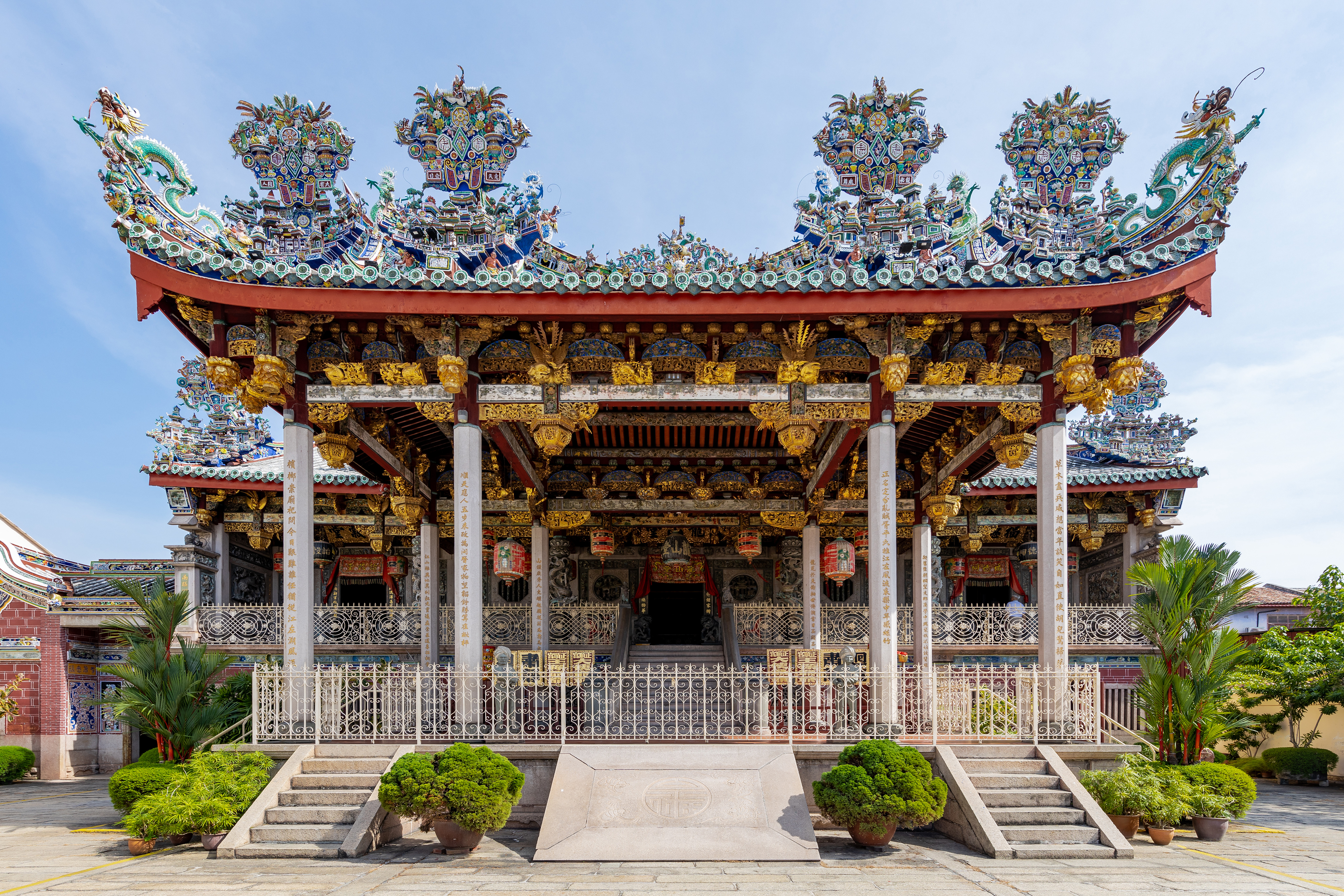
Khoo Kongsi, the largest Hokkien clan house in Malaysia.

Hoklo architecture is, for the most part, similar to any other traditional Chinese architectural style, but is characterized by higher and more slanted rooftops, the prominent use of decorative wood inlays, the bolder use of bright colors, as well as the utilization of porcelain. The style has been especially well-preserved by diaspora communities in South-East Asia.

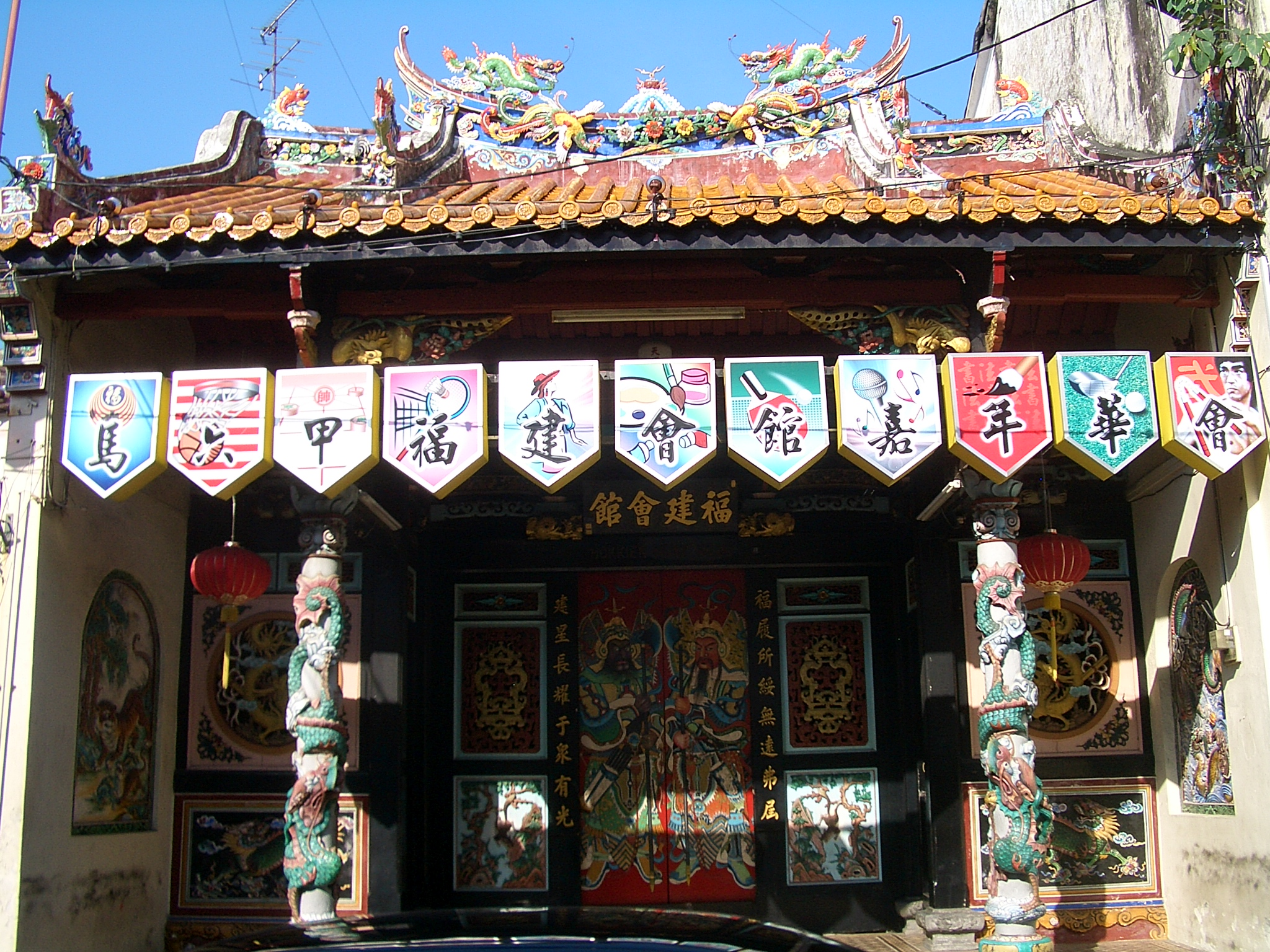
Fujian Assembly Hall in Malacca, Malaysia

Highly decorative and elaborately detailed wood inlays can be seen in the work of the Hokkien communities of Malaysia - for example, the Khoo Clan House in Penang, whereas the Fujian Assembly Hall in Malacca demonstrates the bold use of porcelain in ornamenting the pillars at its entrance. Both buildings are characteristic examples of the traditional Hoklo building and architectural styles brought over by Chinese immigrants to Malaysia.

The main halls of Hoklo public buildings are also a little different in that they are usually decorated with two dragons on the rooftop at the furthest left and right corners and with a miniature figure of a pagoda at the center of the rooftop. Examples of the use of dragons on the rooftop include the Kaiyuan Temple in Fujian, the Khoo Clan House in Penang, Malaysia, the Fujian Assembly Hall in Hoi An, Vietnam.

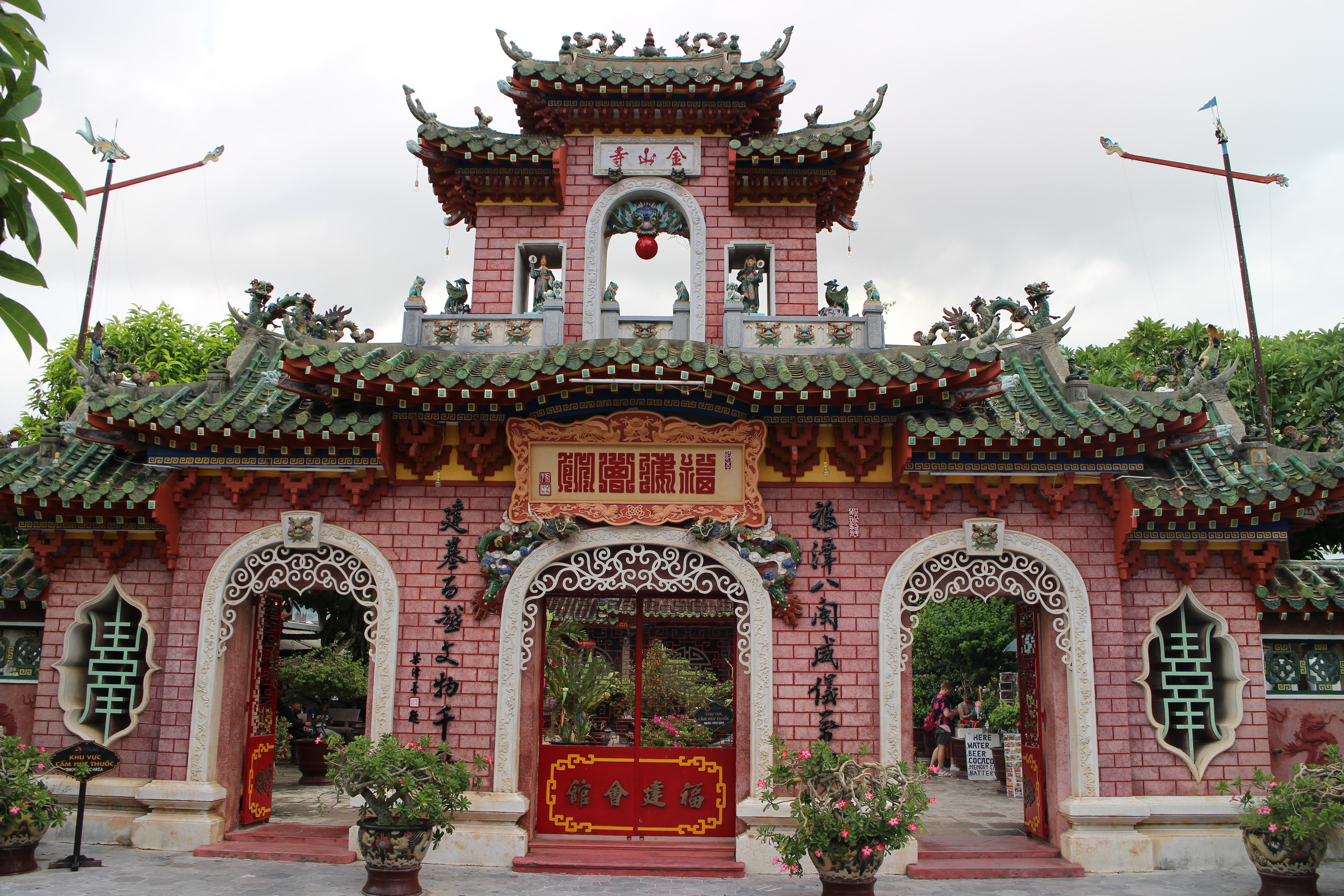
Fujian Assembly Hall in Vietnam, Hoi An

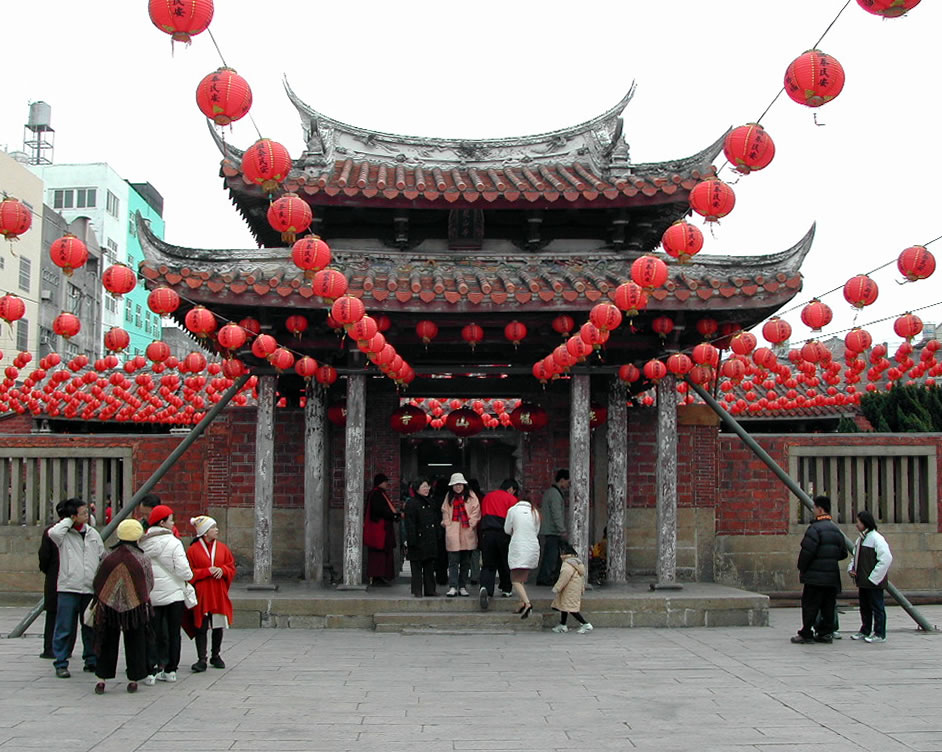
Hoklo architecture styled Lukang Longshan Temple, with its distinguished swallowtail-roof.

=== Language ===
The Hokkien dialect or topolect belongs to the Sinitic group of dialects or topolects known as Minnan. This language group further includes dialects such as Henghua, Teochew, and Hainanese.

The Hokkien people speak Hokkien, which is mutually intelligible to the Teochew language but to a small degree. Hokkien can be traced back to the Tang Dynasty, and it has roots from earlier periods such as the Northern and Southern Dynasties and also a little influence from other sinitic languages as well.

Min dialect map

Hokkien has one of the most diverse phoneme inventories among sinitic varieties, with more consonants than Standard Mandarin or Standard Yue. Vowels are more-or-less similar to that of Standard Mandarin. Hokkien varieties retain many pronunciations that are no longer found in other Sinitic varieties. These include the pronunciation of the /ʈ/ initial as /t/, which is now /tʂ/ (Pinyin 'zh') in Mandarin (e.g. 'bamboo' 竹 is tik, but zhú in Mandarin), having disappeared before the 6th century in other Sinitic varieties. Hokkien has 5 to 7 tones, or 7 to 9 tones according to traditional sense, depending on the variety. The Amoy dialect for example, has 7-8 tones.

== Distribution ==
Speakers of proper Hokkien language live in the areas of Xiamen, Quanzhou and Zhangzhou in southern Fujian. Most Hokkien-speaking groups in southern Fujian refer to themselves by the area where they live, for example: Quanzhou, Zhangzhou, Xiamen or Longyan people. In eastern Guangdong and southern Zhejiang, Haklau Min and Zhenan Min speakers also identify themselves as Hoklo people.

== Diaspora ==
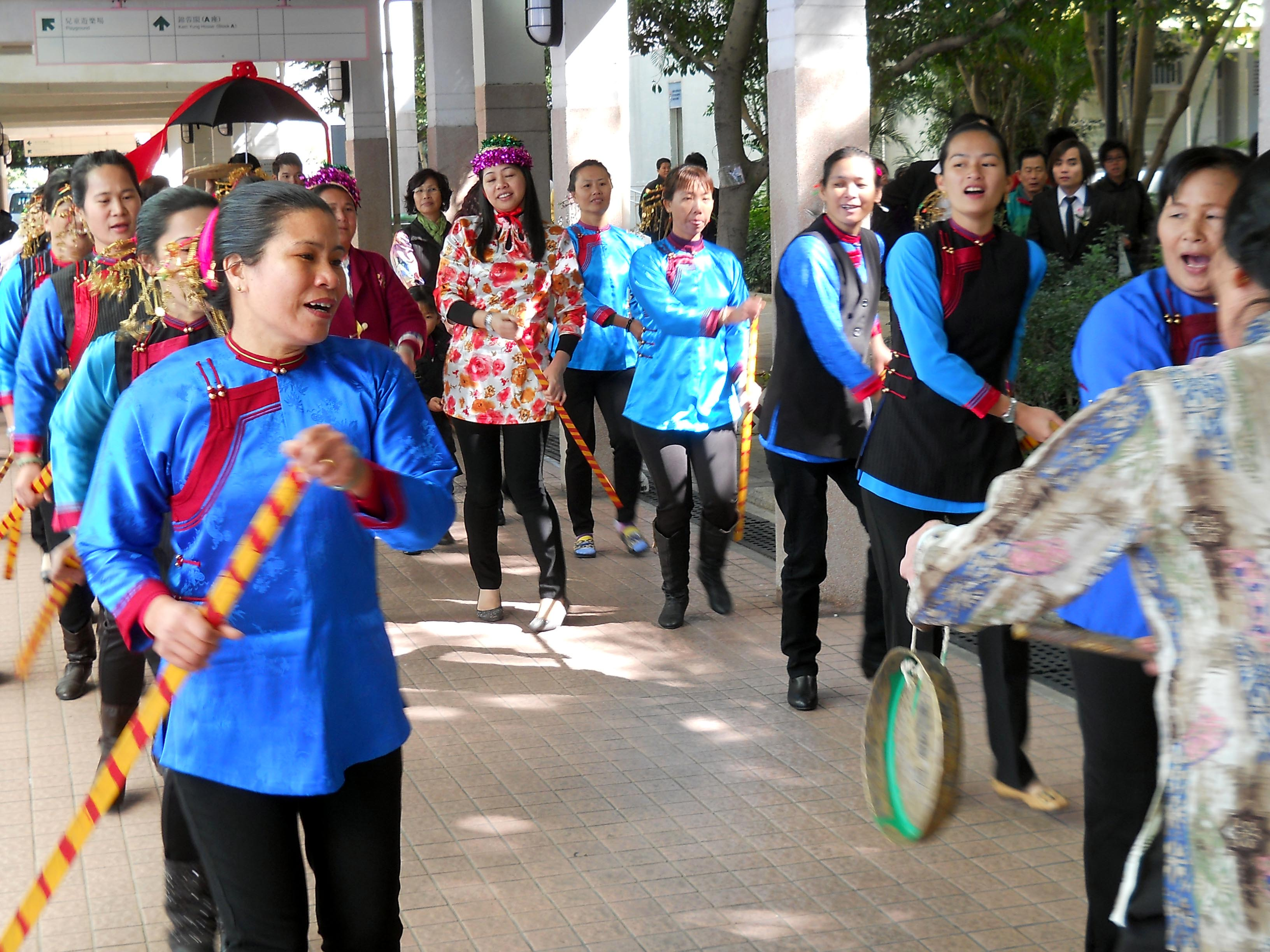
Hokkien women performing the Dragon Boat dance in traditional attire in Hong Kong.

=== Taiwan ===
Southern Min-speaking areas in South China and Taiwan. Only the speakers of Quanzhou-Zhangzhou dialects (also known as Hokkien) are seen as Hoklos.

About 70% of the Taiwanese people descend from Hoklo immigrants who arrived to the island prior to the start of Japanese rule in 1895. They could be categorized as originating from Xiamen, Quanzhou and Zhangzhou based on their dialects and districts of origin. People from the former two areas (Quanzhou-speaking) were dominant in the north of the island and along the west coast, whereas people from the latter two areas (Zhangzhou-speaking) were dominant in the south and perhaps the central plains as well.

=== Hong Kong ===
In Hong Kong, Hoklo people are among the four groups of indigenous inhabitants. In order to preserve their culture, the Hoklo along with the Punti, Hakka and Tanka people have special rights under Hong Kong law.

=== Southeast Asia ===
The Hoklo or Hokkien-lang (as they are known in Southeast Asia) are the largest ethnic group among Chinese communities in Malaysia, Singapore, the Philippines, and the southern part of Thailand. These communities contain the highest concentrations of Hokkien-lang in the region. The various Hokkien language are still widely spoken in these countries today. It has also been considered as a heritage language in Timor-Leste where it was once the main spoken language within the Chinese community. Currently the daily use of Hokkien is slowly decreasing in favor of Mandarin Chinese, English, and other local languages.

The Hokkien-lang also make up the largest ethnic group among Chinese Indonesians.

In the Philippines, the Hoklo or Hokkien-lang call themselves Lannang and form the majority of the Sinitic people in the country known as Chinese Filipinos. The native Hokkien language is still spoken there.

=== United States ===
Whilst the majority of the Hokkien Diaspora stayed primarily in Southeast Asia, some Hoklo people migrated to the United States. Hoklo Americans represent a distinct sub-ethnic group; most of these people are descended from post-1960s migrants originating from Southeastern Fujian. Compared to Cantonese or Mandarin-speaking immigrants, Hoklo descendants are a smaller subset of the overall Chinese-American population.

== See also ==
- Hokkien honorifics
- Demographics of Taiwan
- Taiwanese people
- Teochew people
- Cantonese people

== Bibliography ==
- Brown, Melissa J. (2004). Is Taiwan Chinese?: The Impact of Culture, Power and Migration on Changing Identities. Berkeley: University of California Press. ISBN 0-520-23182-1.
- Davidson, James W. (1903). The Island of Formosa, Past and Present. London and New York: Macmillan. OCLC 1887893. OL 6931635M.
- Ding, Picus Sizhi (2016), Southern Min (Hokkien) as a Migrating Language: A Comparative Study of Language Shift and Maintenance Across National Borders, Springer
- The Republic of China Yearbook 2014 (PDF). Executive Yuan, R.O.C. 2014. ISBN 978-986-04-2302-0.
