= Gender-neutral title =

Title that does not indicate gender

A gender neutral title is a title that does not indicate the gender identity, whatever it may be, of the person being formally addressed. Honorifics are used in situations when it is inappropriate to refer to someone only by their first or last name, such as when addressing a letter, or when introducing the person to others.

Although varying between cultures, the use of such titles include:

- Persons who wish not to indicate a gender (binary or otherwise);
- Persons for whom the gender is not known;
- Persons whose biological sex is not on the gender binary (intersex);
- Persons whose gender identity does not fit the gender binary.

== Languages ==
=== Global overview ===
Some languages have near complete or vigorous use of gender-neutral titles in their most common forms, which in some languages may be more than one of their forms.

=== European languages ===
The traditional honorifics of Miss, Mrs, Ms and Mr in English all indicate the binary gender of the individual.

Frauenknecht et al. at die Katholische Universität Eichstätt-Ingolstadt published a 2021 study in the Journal for EuroLinguistiX which rated ten current human languages for only ten job titles regarding "Gender-Inclusive Job Titles", since job titles can in most languages be used directly as titles for individuals or groups using various grammatical methods by language. Compared were Swedish, Finnish, Russian, Slovenian, Italian, Spanish, UK English, French, German and Hungarian in order of tabling. This team found using several rank analysis systems that the trio of Swedish, Finnish and Hungarian had gender-neutral titles for all ten jobs, UK English was close, then Russian. None of this sample of European languages fell in middle ratings. German, Romance languages (Italian, Spanish, French) and as well as Slovenian scored very low.

=== Japan ===
San (さん), sometimes pronounced han (はん) in Kansai dialect, is the most common honorific and is a title of respect typically used between equals of any age. Although the closest analog in English are the honorifics "Mr", "Miss", "Ms" or "Mrs", -san is almost universally added to a person's name; -san can be used in formal and informal contexts, regardless of the person's gender.

=== Thailand ===
Khun (คุณ) is a courtesy title, pronounced with a middle tone, in the Thai language used informally to courteously address someone irrespective of gender.

== English language ==
=== History ===
==== Origins ====
"Mx" was first used in print in 1977, and it is unknown whether there was spoken usage before that. There is some confusion surrounding when Mx became a common way for persons to prefer to be addressed; however, there have been numerous cases of Mx in print from 1977 up until the early 2000s, when usage became more popular. The Oxford and Merriam-Webster English dictionaries added Mx in 2015 and 2016, respectively.

=== Titles in use or proposed for common use ===
Ind stands for individual.

M is the first letter of most gendered titles, both masculine and feminine. The title "M" simply removes the following letters that would designate gender.

Misc stands for miscellaneous.

Mre is short for the word "mystery".

Msr is a combination of "Miss", a feminine title, and "Sir", which is typically masculine.

Mx is a title commonly used by non-binary people as well as those who do not identify with the gender binary, and first appeared in print in the 1970s. The "x" is intended to stand as a wildcard character, and does not imply a "mixed" gender. Pronunciation of "Mx" is not yet standardized; it is frequently pronounced "mix" but sometimes with a schwa as "məx", or even as "em-ex".

Mt can stand for either Mistrum or Mont. Mistrum is the result of removing the "er" from mister and the "ress" from mistress. The Latin neutral form of "tor" and "trix", is "trum". Mont is a nature-oriented choice. It can be a reference to the root of the origin word for Mr/Ms, which is Magis. Magis means great or high.

Mg stands for Magis. Related to Magister, an origin word for Mr/Ms.

Pr is short for the word "person", pronounced "per".

== Professional and military titles ==
In many cases, gender-non-conforming individuals have used professional titles such as Captain, Doctor, or Coach to avoid gendered titles. This practice is seen in the media, frequently in the case of women attempting to avoid the discrimination associated with femininity in professional settings.

Dr, referring to one who has obtained a PhD, MD, or other doctorate-level degree. Some non-binary people who have achieved such schooling prefer to use this title as it does not inherently indicate any one gender.

== Trans in the US ==
Activists, supporters and groups such as the Trans Educators Network, The Trevor Project, and GLAAD are working toward awareness and acceptance of alternative honorifics, including Mx.

== See also ==
- English honorifics
- Gender marking in job titles
- Honorific
- San (Japanese honorific)
- Ssi (Korean honorific)
- Title
