= Canadian honorifics =

Honorific prefixes in Canada

Honorifics in Canada are accorded to various office holders in government—in the federal, provincial, and municipal jurisdictions—as well as judges, members of the armed forces, and religious figures. Two styles—the Right Honourable and Honourable—are considered formal, while others, such as Your Excellency, are regarded as honorific and complimentary to the formal styles. Honours stem from the Canadian Crown.

== Royal and governmental honorifics ==
"Honorific	Accorded to	Entitlement to style
His/Her Majesty (FR: Sa Majesté)	Canadian king and queen, or queen consort	For life (including widowhood in the case of a queen consort), but lost if the monarch abdicates
His/Her Royal Highness (FR: Son Altesse Royale)	Children and male-line grandchildren of the current or a former reigning monarch	For life
His/Her Royal Highness (FR: Son Altesse Royale)	Wives of the children and male-line grandchildren of the current or a former reigning monarch	For the duration of marriage and any subsequent widowhood, but lost in cases of divorce
His/Her Royal Highness (FR: Son Altesse Royale)	Husband of a queen regnant (unless he is also a monarch)	As granted by the monarch, for life unless otherwise provided for
His/Her Excellency (FR: Son Excellence)	Governor General of Canada	While in office; thereafter the Right Honourable
His/Her Excellency (FR: Son Excellence)	Consort of the governor general	While spouse in office
His/Her Excellency (FR: Son Excellence)	Ambassadors	Only in the country of accreditation.
The Right Honourable (FR:Le/La très honorable)	Governor general of Canada; Prime minister of Canada; Chief justice of Canada	For life (since 1963 a right associated with the offices)
The Right Honourable (FR:Le/La très honorable)	Other individuals as determined by the King-in-Council, or as appointed to Privy Council of the United Kingdom prior to 1963 (see list below)	For life, right granted at pleasure
His/Her Honour (FR:Son Honneur)	Lieutenant governors	While in office; thereafter The Honourable.
His/Her Honour (FR:Son Honneur)	Consorts of lieutenant governors	While spouse in office
The Honourable (FR: L'honorable)	Members of the King's Privy Council for Canada, consists of: all ministers of the crown in the federal governments, by practice upon their appointment; other persons appointed by the governor general on the recommendation of the prime minister	For life, by nature of being member of Privy Council for Canada (subject to removal from council)
The Honourable (FR: L'honorable)	Lieutenant governors Senators	For life, by practice
The Honourable (FR: L'honorable)	Members of the Executive Council (provincial ministers) of four provinces: Nova Scotia (since 2009, initially only those who ended their ministerial service after 2009. In 2010 the privilege was extended to all living former ministers who ended their service earlier. In 2014 the privilege was further granted to six living former speakers); Saskatchewan (since 2019); Alberta (since 2022); Ontario (since 2025)	For life, by nature of being honorary members of the Executive Council pursuant to specific legislations, subject to removal upon conviction of certain offences
The Honourable (FR: L'honorable)	Speaker of the House of Commons; Territorial commissioners Federally appointed judges: Puisne judges of the Supreme Court of Canada; Judges of the federal courts (Court of Appeal, Federal Court, Tax Court, Court Martial Appeal, Courts Martial); Judges of the provincial and territorial superior courts (Courts of Appeal of all provinces; Superior Courts of ON, QC; Supreme Courts of BC, NL, NS, PEI, YK, NWT; Courts of King's Bench of AB, SK, MB, NB; Nunavut Court of Justice	For life, by practice (Generally granted the right to maintain the title by the governor general upon retirement)
The Honourable (FR: L'honorable)	Executive council members (e.g. provincial and territorial premiers and cabinet ministers); Speakers of provincial legislatures; provincial & territorial court judges	So styled while in office, unless otherwise authorized to maintain the style for life.
His/Her Worship (FR: Son Honneur)	Mayors; Justices of the peace	While in office.

=== Right to be styled the Right Honourable ===
Prior to 1963, the right to be styled the Right Honourable was not automatic, but associated with the membership of the Imperial Privy Council of the United Kingdom. Three prime ministers (Alexander Mackenzie, John Abbott and Mackenzie Bowell) and three chief justices (William Buell Richards, William Johnstone Ritchie and Patrick Kerwin) were never members and thus were not entitled to be styled as such. Prime Minister Charles Tupper was appointed after he was no longer Prime Minister. Governor General Lord Byng was not a member, but was entitled to be styled as such by nature of being a viscount.

The following Canadians were entitled to be styled the Right Honourable upon being sworn of the Imperial Privy Council:

Reign of Queen Victoria (1837–1901)

- 1879: Sir John A. Macdonald (while prime minister)
- 1886: Sir Sir John Rose (while informally serving as unofficial representative of the Canadian government in London)
- 1894: Sir John Thompson (while prime minister) Thompson died from a sudden heart attack during the luncheon given by Queen Victoria in his honour following being sworn of council.
- 1897, sworn of council along with senior leaders of other British Dominions and colonies, including Sir William Whiteway, Colonial Premier of Newfoundland
  - Sir Wilfrid Laurier (while prime minister)
  - Sir Samuel Henry Strong (while chief justice)

Reign of King Edward VII (1901–1910)

- 1902: Sir Richard John Cartwright (while Minister of Trade and Commerce)
- 1904: Sir Henri-Elzéar Taschereau (while Chief Justice, before automatic conferment)
- 1904: Lord Strathcona and Mount Royal (while High Commissioner to the United Kingdom, for extensive philanthropy in Canada and Britain)
- 1907: Sir Charles Tupper, 1st Baronet (after he was no longer prime minister)
- 1908: Sir Charles Fitzpatrick (while chief justice)

Reign of King George V (1910–1936)

- 1912: Robert Borden (while prime minister) The grandson of former Governor General Lord Durham was sworn of council on the same day.
- 1916 Birthday Honours: Sir George Eulas Foster (while Minister of Trade and Commerce)
- 1919 (sworn of together)
  - Sir Louis Henry Davies (while chief justice)
  - Sir Lyman Duff (while puisne justice of the Supreme Court of Canada, became chief justice in 1933)
- 1920 New Year Honours
  - Arthur Sifton (while Secretary of State for Canada, for his contribution at the Paris Peace Conference)
  - Charles Doherty (while Minister of Justice, for contribution at the Paris Peace Conference)
  - Sir William Thomas White (for service as acting Prime Minister while Prime Minister Robert Borden was attending the Paris Peace Conference)
- 1920: Arthur Meighen (while prime minister)
- 1922: William Lyon Mackenzie King (while prime minister)
- 1923 Birthday Honours: William Stevens Fielding (while Minister of Finance)
- 1925:
  - Sir William Mulock (while Chief Justice of Ontario)
  - George Perry Graham (while Minister of Railway and Canals, upon losing his seat)
- 1925: Francis Alexander Anglin (while chief justice)
- 1930: R. B. Bennett (while prime minister)
- 1931: Sir George Halsey Perley (while a minister without portfolio)
- 1937 Coronation Honours: Ernest Lapointe (while Justice Minister and Mackenzie King's Quebec's lieutenant)

Reign of King George VI (1936–1952)

- 1941 Birthday Honours: Vincent Massey (while High Commissioner of Canada in the United Kingdom, became Governor General in 1952)
- 1941: Raoul Dandurand (while Government Leader in Senate)
- 1946 New Year Honours
  - Louis St. Laurent (while Secretary of State for External Affairs, became Prime Minister himself in 1948)
  - James Lorimer Ilsley (while Minister of Finance)
  - C. D. Howe (while minister responsible for post war reconstruction)
- 1947 New Year Honours
  - Ian Alistair Mackenzie (while Government House Leader)
  - James Garfield Gardiner (while Minister of Agriculture)
- 1947: Thibaudeau Rinfret (while chief justice)

Reign of Queen Elizabeth II (1952 to until end of practice in 1963)

- 1957: John Diefenbaker (while prime minister)
- 1963: Lester B. Pearson (while prime minister)
- 1963: Georges Vanier (while Governor General)

The following Canadians were specifically granted the right to be styled the Right Honourable since 1963 without having served as Governor General, Prime Minister of Chief Justice:

- 1992: (on advice of Prime Minister Brian Mulroney as part of Canada's 125th anniversary celebrations)
  - Martial Asselin (while Lieutenant Governor of Quebec, former cabinet minister)
  - Ellen Fairclough (first woman ever to serve in the Canadian Cabinet)
  - Alvin Hamilton (former cabinet minister)
  - Paul Martin Sr. (former Secretary of State for External Affairs and High Commissioner to the United Kingdom)
  - Jean-Luc Pépin (former cabinet minister)
  - Jack Pickersgill (former Clerk of the Privy Council and cabinet minister)
  - Robert Stanfield (former Leader of the Opposition and Premier of Nova Scotia)
- 1993: Don Mazankowski (on advice of Prime Minister Brian Mulroney a week prior the end of their respective service as Prime Minister and Deputy Prime Minister)
- 2002: Herb Gray (on advice of Prime Minister Jean Chrétien upon the end of his service as Chretien's Deputy Prime Minister)

== Military honorifics ==
Officers and non-commission members within the Canadian Armed Forces use ranks in accordance with the ranks and insignia of the Royal Canadian Navy, the Canadian Army, or the Royal Canadian Air Force, depending on which element they are a part of. Although all of the rank structures of the separate services were abolished with the unification of all three into one Canadian Forces in 1964, distinctive uniforms, insignia, and rank names have been gradually restored since then. Former members who were honourably released after serving a minimum of 10 years may continue to use the rank title held at the time of release with the word "(Retired)" or abbreviation "(Ret'd)". Similarly, members of the Supplementary Reserve sub-component of the Reserve Force may use their rank in the same manner as former members, unless on duty or engaged in military activities.

== Religious honorifics ==
Religions are free to use their own titles and honorifics, provided they do not contradict those used elsewhere in Canada. This is seen in the use of the style His Excellency by Roman Catholic archbishops and bishops, which is not recognized by Canadian civil authorities.

== See also ==
- List of post-nominal letters in Canada
- Title and style of the Canadian monarch
- List of titles and honours of Elizabeth II
- List of titles and honours of Prince Philip, Duke of Edinburgh
- List of titles and honours of Charles III
- List of titles and honours of Queen Elizabeth the Queen Mother
- English honorifics
