= Korean honorifics =

Honorifics in the Korean language and culture

- Hangul: 높임말
- RR: nopimmal
- MR: nop'immal

Alternate name
- Hangul: 경어
- Hanja: 敬語
- RR: gyeongeo
- MR: kyŏngŏ

The Korean language has a system of linguistic honorifics that reflects the social status of speakers. Speakers use honorifics to indicate their social relationship with the addressee and/or subject of the conversation concerning their age, social status, gender, degree of intimacy, and situational context. One basic rule of Korean honorifics is "making oneself lower"; in other words, the speaker uses honorific and humble forms to lower themselves when speaking. The honorific system is reflected in honorific particles, verbs with special honorific forms, honorific markers, and special honorific forms of nouns that include terms of address.

== Impact of age ==
The age difference between speakers affects honorific usage. Korean speakers in South Korea and North Korea—except in very intimate situations—use different honorifics depending on whether the other person's year of birth is before, the same, or after their own. The hierarchy is expressed through the terms hyeong (형) and oppa (오빠), both of which mean 'elder brother'; nuna (누나) and eonni (언니), both of which mean 'elder sister'; and dongsaeng (동생; 'younger sibling'). The terms are not limited to one's familial relatives.Some Koreans believe it is unreasonable to use honorifics when the age difference between speakers is small and try to differentiate the use of honorifics based on closeness within a small age gap.

The contemporary hierarchy and customs of North and South Korea were shaped by Japanese colonial rule and the era during which Park Chung-hee, a former member of the Japanese military, led the military dictatorship in South Korea. Before 1945, Japan operated its schools under a strict military-like hierarchy; the age hierarchy was more strict than it is now. These elements of the Empire of Japan greatly influenced Korean society. After Japan's defeat in 1945, this hierarchy was greatly weakened in Japanese society due to the disbandment of the Japanese military and the establishment of a civilian government; in Korea, elements of the Japanese military persisted. Many remnants of the age hierarchy system remain. In Korea, it is common to frequently ask people about their age.

== Honorific particles ==
The Korean language can index deference or respect toward a sentence referent in subject or dative position through the application of lexical choices such as honorific particles. There is no honorific expression for inanimate -e (에). The honorific version of -ege (에게) is -kke (께). For example, while seonsaengnim (선생님; 'teacher') is neutral and seonsaengnimi (선생님이) denotes the role of the noun as the subject of the sentence, seonsaengnimkkeseo (선생님께서) still means 'teacher', but it indicates that the sentence in which it occurs is an honorific sentence and the speaker is treating the subject, seonsaengnim (선생님), courteously.

Base noun	Plain Particles		Honorific Particles
Subject particle	After vowel	After consonant	-kkeseo (께서)
Subject particle	-ga (가)	-i (이)	-kkeseo (께서)
Dative particle	Inanimate	Animate	-kke (께)
Dative particle	-e (에)	-ege (에게)	-kke (께)

== Honorific pronouns and nouns ==
In Korean, the honorific form of first-person pronouns are humble forms; speakers refer to themselves with humble pronouns and humble verb forms to make themselves lower.

	Plain form	Humble form	Translation
First person pronouns	na (나)	jeo (저)	'I'
First person pronouns	uri (우리)	jeohui (저희)	'we'

Second-person pronouns do not appear in honorific conversation and professional titles and kinship terms are used instead, in a phenomenon known as pronoun avoidance. The most common terms of address are kinship terms, which are divided into plain and honorific levels. The honorific suffix -nim (님) is affixed to many kinship terms to make them honorific. Thus, someone may address his own grandmother as halmeoni (할머니) but refer to someone else's grandmother as halmeonim (할머님).

Unlike Japanese, which allows a title to be used alone for addressing people when an honorific expression is required (e.g., 先生 sensei 'teacher', 社長 shachō '[company] president', 教授 kyōju 'professor'), Korean does not allow lone titles for addressing people. It is considered impolite to address someone as sajang (사장; 'president') or gyosu (교수; 'professor') without a suffix such as the honorific -nim (님)—except when addressing social equals or those lower in status.

Base noun	Honorific	Translation
harabeoji (할아버지)	harabeonim (할아버님)	'grandfather'
halmeoni (할머니)	halmeonim (할머님)	'grandmother'
appa / abeoji (아빠 / 아버지)	abeonim (아버님)	'father'
eomma / eomeoni (엄마 / 어머니)	eomeonim (어머님)	'mother'
hyeong (형)	hyeongnim (형님)	'elder brother [of a male]'
nuna (누나)	nunim (누님)	'elder sister [of a male]'
oppa (오빠)	orabeoni (오라버니), orabeonim (오라버님)	'elder brother [of a female]'
eonni (언니)	hyeongnim (형님)	'elder sister [of a female]'
adeul (아들)	adeunim (아드님)	'son'
ttal (딸)	ttanim (따님)	'daughter'

== Addressee honorification ==
Addressee honorification (상대 높임법; sangdae nopimbeop) refers to the way the speaker uses honorifics towards the listener. It is the most developed honorification in Korean, which is mainly realized by the closing expression, which is then largely divided into formal and informal forms, and categorized into six stages according to the degree of honorific.

Formal forms include:

- the hasipsio (하십시오) form, which is the most polite form;
- the hao (하오) form, which is moderately addressee-raising;
- the hage (하게) form, which is moderately addressee-lowering;
- the haera (해라) form, which is the most non-polite form.

Informal forms include:

- the haeyo (해요) form, which is the informal addressee-raising form;
- the hae (해) form, which is the informal addressee-lowering form.

For example, the sentence "Read this book." can be written differently by using different closing expressions, such as:

- i chaegeul ilgeusipsio. (이 책을 읽으십시오.), which uses the hasipsio form;
- i chaegeurilgeusio. (이 책을읽으시오.), which uses the hao form;
- i chaegeurilge. (이 책을읽게.), which uses the hage form;
- i chaegeurilgeora. (이 책을읽어라.), which uses the haera form;
- i chaegeurilgeoyo. (이 책을읽어요.), which uses the haeyo form;
- i chaegeurilgeo. (이 책을읽어.), which uses the hae form.

One must use honorific endings -seumnida (-습니다) and/or -(e)yo (-(에)요) in a formal situation or when addressing acquaintances or strangers, regardless of their age or social status (except pre-adolescent children). The following are honorific endings for the four major types of sentences:

- Declarative -seumnida (-습니다);
- Interrogative -simnikka (-십니까);
- Propositive -seupsida (-습시다);
- Imperative -siyo / -sipsio (-시요 / -십시오)

However, in informal situations such as speaking to close friends or family members, these honorific endings are usually dropped and substituted with -eo (-어) or -a (-아).

The setting, ages, occupations, and other factors contribute to the relations between speaker, addressee, and the referent within this system. Traditionally, Korean honorifics were based on hierarchical relation in society, such as rank in occupations, but this has changed over time to develop into a system based on politeness and closeness. Hierarchy-based honorific endings are forgone with relationships such as one between older and younger sibling in which the younger sibling uses the -eo / -a (-어 / -아) endings in place of -eoyo / -ayo (-어요 / -아요) without change in respect, instead exhibiting closeness in the relationship. Furthermore, the use of jondaenmal (존댓말)—or honorific language—towards someone who is perceived as close can be perceived as socially awkward or emotionally distant (or in other contexts, playful or sarcastic); whereas, the use of banmal (반말)—or crude language—towards one who is a stranger or acquaintance would be perceived as rude.

== Honorific verbs ==
When the subject of the conversation is older or has higher seniority than the speaker, the Korean honorific system primarily index the subject by adding the honorific suffix -si (-시) or -eusi (-으시) into the stem verb.

Thus, gada (가다; 'to go') becomes gasida (가시다). A few verbs have suppletive honorific forms:

Base form	Regular honorific	Translation
gada (가다)	gasida (가시다)	'to go'
batda (받다)	badeusida (받으시다)	'to receive'
jakda (작다)	jageusida (작으시다)	'(to be) small'
Base form	Suppletive honorific	Translation
itda (있다)	gyesida (계시다)	'to be (somewhere, at a place); to have'
masida (마시다)	deusida (드시다)	'to drink'
meokda (먹다)	deusida (드시다)	'to eat'
meokda (먹다)	japsusida (잡수시다)	'to eat'
jada (자다)	jumusida (주무시다)	'to sleep'
baegopeuda (배고프다)	sijanghasida (시장하시다)	'to be hungry'

A few verbs have suppletive humble forms, used when the speaker is referring to themself in polite situations. These include deurida (드리다) and ollida (올리다) for juda (주다; 'to give'). deurida (드리다) is substituted for juda (주다; 'to give') when the latter is used as an auxiliary verb, while ollida (올리다; 'to raise up') is used for juda (주다) in the sense of 'to offer'.

== Honorific forms of address ==
Korean pronouns have their own set of polite equivalents; for instance, jeo (저) is the humble form of na (나) for the first-person singular pronoun ('I'), and jeohui (저희) is the humble form of uri (우리) for the first-person plural pronoun ('we'). However, Korean allows for coherent syntax without pronouns, effectively making Korean a so-called pro-drop language; thus, Koreans avoid using the second-person singular pronoun, especially when using honorific forms. Third-person pronouns are occasionally avoided as well, mainly to maintain a sense of politeness. Although the honorific form of the second-person singular pronoun neo (너) is dangsin (당신; 'friend, dear'), this term is used only as a form of address in a few specific social contexts, such as between people who are married to each other, or in an ironic sense between strangers. Other words are usually substituted where possible; e.g., the person's name, a kinship term, a professional title, the plural yeoreobun (여러분), or no word at all, relying on context to supply meaning instead.

=== Spacing spelling convention ===
The National Institute of Korean Language classifies nim/ssi/gun/yang as dependent nouns that follow a proper noun, and they prescribe that a space should appear between a noun and its dependent noun (e.g., (재범 님 jaebeom nim). This is not to be confused with the affix -nim, used with common nouns, since affixes are written without spaces (e.g., 선생님 seonsaengnim).

=== -a / -ya ===
Korean has the vocative case markers which grammatically identify a person, animal, or object being addressed so that they eliminate possible grammatical ambiguities. -a / -ya (-아 / -야) is a casual title used at the end of names, and is not gender exclusive. If a name ends in a consonant, -a is used (e.g., Jinyeonga; 진영아), while -ya is used if the name ends in a vowel (e.g., Yejiya; 예지야). -a/-ya is used only between close friends and people who are familiar with each other, and its use between strangers or distant acquaintances could be considered extremely rude. -a/-ya is only used hierarchically horizontally or downwards: an adult or parent may use it for young children, and those with equal social standing may use it with each other, but a young individual will not use -a/-ya towards one who is older than oneself or holds a higher status than oneself.

Middle Korean had three classes of the vocative case, but practically only -a / -ya (-아 / -야) is remaining in everyday life. -yeo / -iyeo (-여 / -이여) is only used in literature and archaic expressions, and -ha (-하) has completely disappeared.

=== -ssi ===
The honorific suffix -ssi (씨; 氏; 'surname') is the most commonly used honorific used amongst people of approximately equal speech level, and is equivalent to English honorifics Mr./Ms./Mrs. It is attached after the full name (e.g., 이석민 씨), or simply after the first name (e.g., Seongmin ssi; 석민 씨 if the speaker is more familiar with someone. Appending -ssi to the surname (e.g., Bak ssi; 박 씨) can be considered quite rude, as it indicates the speaker considers themself to be of a higher social status than the person with whom they are speaking.

=== -nim ===
The term nim (님) (by itself after a proper noun) is the highest form of honorifics and above -ssi. Nim will follow addressees' names on letters/emails and postal packages. It is often roughly translated as "Mr." or "Ms./Mrs.". -nim (as an affix) is used as a commonplace honorific for guests, customers, clients, and unfamiliar individuals. -nim is also used towards someone who is revered and admired for having a significant amount of skill, intellect, knowledge, etc. and is used for people who are of a higher rank than oneself. Examples include family members (eomeonim 어머님 & abeonim 아버님), teachers (seonsaengnim 선생님), clergy (e.g. pastors – moksanim 목사님), and gods (haneunim 하느님 / hananim 하나님).

=== Seonbae/hubae ===
Seonbae (Hangul: 선배; Hanja: 先輩) is used to address senior colleagues or mentor figures relating to oneself (e.g. older students in school, older/more experienced athletes, mentors, senior colleagues in academia, business, work, etc.). As with English titles such as Doctor, seonbae can be used either by itself or as a title. Hubae (후배; 後輩) is used to refer to juniors. Usually, people in senior and junior relationships call each other '선배님 (Seonbaenim)' (e.g. Chaeryeong seonbaenim 채령 선배님) and '후배님(Hubaenim)' at the first meeting.

=== Gun/yang ===
Gun (Hangul: 군; Hanja: 君) is used moderately in formal occasions (such as weddings), for young, unmarried males. Gun is also used to address young boys by an adult. Yang (양; 孃) is the female equivalent of gun and is used to address young girls. Both are used in a similar fashion to ssi, following either the whole name or the first name in solitude. For example, if the boy's name is '김유겸 (Kim Yugyeom)', he can be called as '김유겸 군 (Kim Yugyeom-gun)' or '유겸 군 (Yugyeom-gun)'. And if the girl's name is '임나연 (Im Nayeon)', she can be called as '임나연 양 (Im Nayeon-yang)' or '나연 양 (Nayeon-yang)'.

=== Less common forms of address ===
- Gwiha (Hangul: 귀하; Hanja: 貴下) can be seen commonly in formal letters, often used by a company to a client.
- Gakha (각하: 閣下) is used only in extremely formal occasions, usually when addressing presidents, high officials, or bishops and archbishops. Somewhat avoided nowadays due to its connotations to Imperial Japan.
- Hapha (합하; 閤下) was used to address the father of the king who was not a king (Daewongun), or the oldest son of the crown prince.
- Jeoha (저하; 邸下) was only used when addressing the crown prince.
- Jeonha (전하; 殿下) was only used when addressing kings, now mostly used to address cardinals.
- Pyeha (폐하; 陛下) was used only when addressing emperors.
- Seongha (성하; 聖下) is used when addressing popes, patriarchates or the Dalai Lama; the equivalent of the English word "His Holiness" or "His Beatitude".
- Nari (나리) or alternatively, naeuri (나으리), was used by commoners in the Joseon dynasty to refer to people of higher status but below daegam (대감; 大監), English equivalent of "His Excellency". The honorific is of native Korean origin.

== Relative honorifics ==
When speaking to someone about another person, you must calculate the relative difference in position between the person you are referring to and the person you are speaking to. This is known as apjonbeop 압존법 (壓尊法) or "relative honorifics".

Relative honorifics (압존법) are usually used at home or in relationships between teachers and students. For example, "할아버지, 아버지가 아직 안 왔습니다. (Harabeoji, abeojiga ajik an watseumnida.)" means "Grandfather, father hasn't come yet." Both grandfather and father are in higher positions than the speaker, but grandfather is much higher than father. In this special case, Korean does not use honorifics for father in order to honor grandfather. Therefore, in this sentence, "아버지가 (abeojiga)" is used rather than "아버지께서 (abeojikkeseo)" and "왔습니다 (watseumnida)" rather than "오셨습니다 (osyeotseumnida)".

For example, one must change the post positional particle and verb if the person you are speaking to is a higher position (age, title, etc.) than the person you are referring to. "부장님, 이 과장님께서는 지금 자리에 안 계십니다 (bujangnim, I gwajangnimkkeseoneun jigeum jarie an gyesimnida)" translates to 'General Manager, Manager Lee is not at his desk now', with the bolded parts elevating the manager higher than the general manager, even though they both are in a higher position than the speaker. The general manager could be offended by the fact that the speaker elevated the manager above them.

However, relative honorifics in the workplace is far from Korean traditional language etiquette. In front of a superior, lowering another superior who is in a lower position may apply in private relationships, such as between family members and between teacher and student.

Therefore, the above sentence can be modified according to workplace etiquette as follows.

- "부장**님**, 이 과장**님은** 지금 자리에 안 **계십니다**. (Bujang**nim**, I gwajang**nimeun** jigeum jarie an **gyesimnida**.)"

== Humble speech ==
Korean also has humble speech, usually denoted with the inclusion of the affix -오- [-o-].

=== Humble suffix ===
The humble suffix has the effect of lowering the status of the speaker against the addressee, thereby increasing the degree of respect shown by the former toward the latter. The humble suffix, is rare nowadays in Standard Seoul dialect, however, it is employed in religious services as well as historical literary or entertainment media.

The humble suffix appears in four different allomorphs:

1. (으)오 (eu)o:

(으)오 (eu)o
Before vowel inflectional endings	Example
-ㅂ니다 -mnida	차옵니다 'It is cold'
-나-na	차오나 'Although it is cold'
-면 -myeon	차오면 'If it is cold'
-며 -myeo	차오며 'It is cold and'
-니 -ni	차오니 'Since it is cold'

2. 사오 (sao)

(으)오 (eu)o
Before consonant inflectional endings	Example
-ㅂ니다 -mnida	죽사옵니다 'I am dying'
-나 -na	죽사오나 'I die but'
-면 -myeon	죽사오면 'If I die'
-며 -myeo	죽사오며 'I die and'
-니 -ni	죽사오니 'Since I die'

3. (으)옵 (eu)op:

(으)옵 (eu)op
Before vowel inflectional endings	Example
-나이다 -naida	가옵나이다 'He goes, Lord'
-나이까 -naikka	가옵나이까 'Does he go, Lord?'
-소서 -soseo	주시옵소서 'I pray Lord please give.'
-지요 -jiyo	가옵지요 'I knew he was going'
-고 -go	가옵고 있습니다 'I am going'
-더라도 -deorado	가옵더라도 'Even if I go'

4. 사옵 saop)

사옵 saop
Before consonant inflectional endings	Example
-나이다 -naida	'죽사옵나이다 'He dies, Lord.'
-나이까 -naikka	죽사옵나이까 'Does he die, Lord?'

==== Difference between humble and honorific suffix ====
The honorific suffix -시 / (으) 시 (-si / (eu) si) and the humble suffix, both employed to express the speaker's respect, are different from one another in that the honorific suffix directs the speaker's respect to the subject of a sentence, whereas the humble suffix directs it to the addressee. Respect shown by the humble suffix is the result of degradation of the speaker's status against the addressee(s), for example:

- 선생님이 오셔 (seonsaengnimi osyeo) – 'The teacher is coming', whereby a student talking to another student in casual informal style while giving respect to teacher by employing honorific affix, 셔 (시 + 어) (syeo (si + eo))
- 아이가 가옵니다 (aiga gaomnida) – 'The child is going', whereby a servant speaking to master in formal polite style while humbling himself with affix -옵- (-op-) showing no deference to the subject.
- 할머님이 오시옵니다 (halmeonimi osiomnida) – 'grandma is coming', whereby a child speaking to an elder such as their grandmother or someone in high authority in a formal and polite style, while still humbling himself or herself with the affix -옵- (-op-), and while also showing deference to the subject by employing the honorific affix -시- (-si-).

==== Use in modern speech ====
The humble affix is still used at certain times for example in "but/even-though" statements as is -오나 (-ona). For instance, President Yoon Suk-yeol in 2022 was asked: ""정말 외람되오나" ("jeongmal oeramdoeona") ('It is very impudent of me but [can I ask you]?')

== See also ==
- Korean speech levels

=== Other languages ===
- T–V distinction (politeness differences more generally)
- Chinese honorifics
- Chinese titles
- Japanese honorifics
