= 2025–2026 China–Japan diplomatic crisis =

Ongoing dispute over support for Taiwan

- Part of China–Japan relations
- それが戦艦を使って、そして武力の行使も伴うものであれば、これはどう考えても存立危機事態になり得るケースであると私は考えます。 [If it were to involve the use of warships and the exercise of force, then by any measure, it could constitute a situation threatening Japan’s survival.] — Sanae Takaichi
- Date: 7 November 2025 – present (1 year, 2 weeks and 1 day)
- Location: China and Japan
- Caused by: Political status of Taiwan; Japanese support for Taiwan
- Status: Ongoing: China restricts imports from and exports to Japan; Chinese tourism to Japan drops

Parties
| China | Japan |

Lead figures
| Xi Jinping; Wang Yi; Sun Weidong; Fu Cong; Liu Jinsong; Wu Jianghao; Xue Jian | Sanae Takaichi; Toshimitsu Motegi; Takehiro Funakoshi; Kazuyuki Yamazaki; Masaaki Kanai; Kenji Kanasugi; Keiji Furuya; Eriko Yamatani |

Relations between China and Japan entered a state of crisis in November 2025, after Japanese prime minister Sanae Takaichi said in the Japanese parliament that a Chinese attack on Taiwan could potentially constitute an "existential crisis for Japan" under the Legislation for Peace and Security, allowing Japan to take military action in collective self-defence. Following these remarks, the Chinese consul general in Osaka, Xue Jian, made threatening comments against Takaichi on X, triggering a diplomatic row between the countries.

Both sides protested the other's remarks. In response to questions from Japanese parliamentarians, Takaichi refused to withdraw her remarks, arguing that they were consistent with the Japanese government's existing position on the issue. Japan requested that China take "appropriate measures" against Xue. China refused, demanded Takaichi retract her statements, and accused Japan of "neo-militarism", issued numerous retaliatory measures against Japan, including issuing a travel advisory, restricting travel and cultural exchanges, and cutting off seafood imports from the country. In 2026, the dispute further escalated with China restricting the export of dual-use items and rare earth materials to Japan.

== Background ==
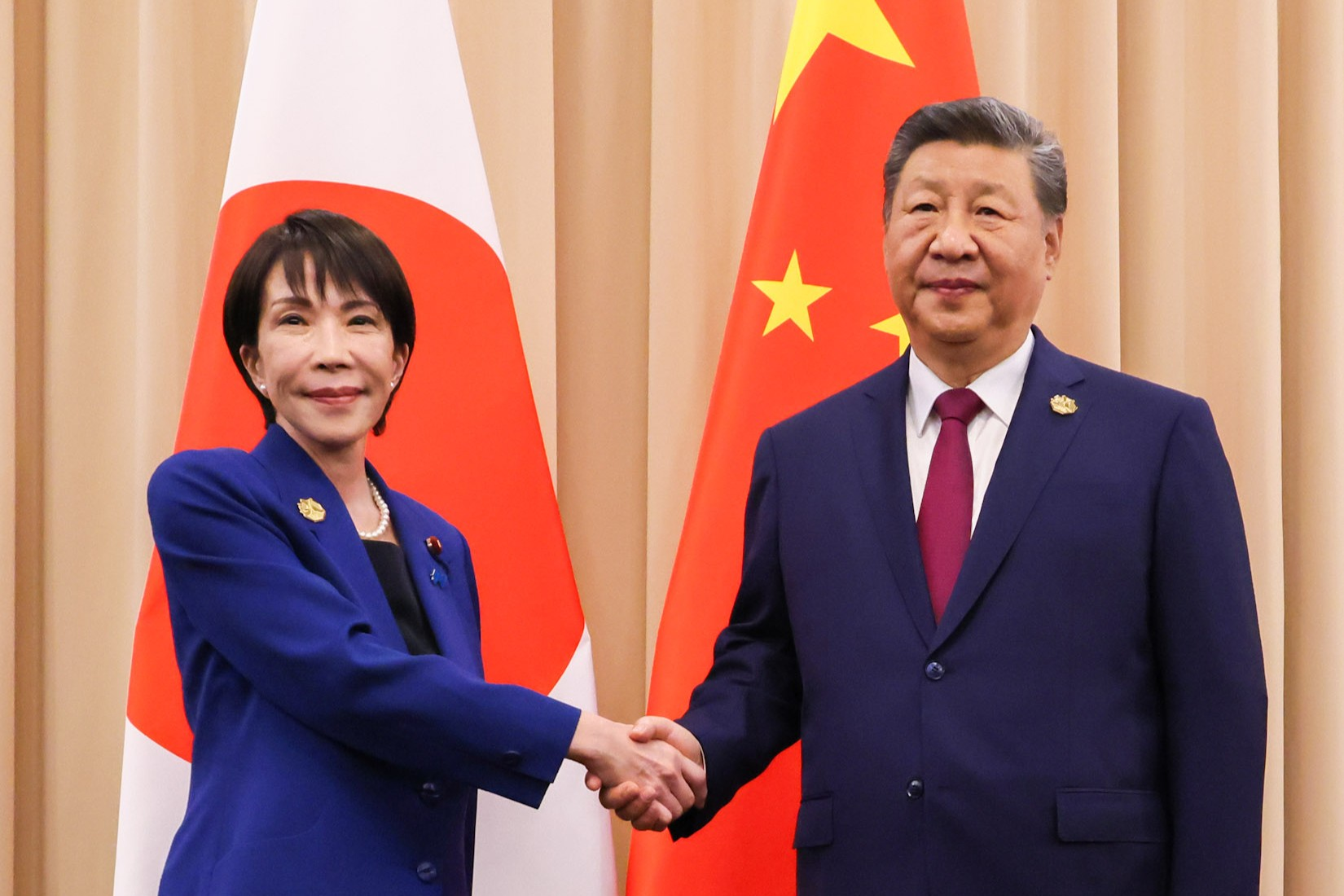
Japanese Prime Minister Sanae Takaichi with Chinese leader Xi Jinping during the APEC South Korea 2025, 31 October 2025

From 1895 to 1945, the island of Taiwan along with the Penghu islands was under Japanese colonial rule by the terms of the Treaty of Shimonoseki in the aftermath of the First Sino-Japanese War. Following the surrender of Japan in the conclusion of World War II, Taiwan was handed over to the Republic of China (ROC) in 1945, but the ROC soon lost its mainland territory due to its defeat in the Chinese Civil War and retreated its government to Taiwan in 1949. Japan formally "renounced all right, title, and claim" to Taiwan in 1952, without naming the specific receiver of Taiwan's sovereignty, which began a long-standing geopolitical dispute. Since 1947, under the auspices of the Supreme Commander for the Allied Powers, the Japanese constitution has maintained a clause of Article 9, which prohibits the use of force to resolve international disputes. From the 1980s the Japanese government has taken the stance that protection of the sea lane between Japan and the Bashi Channel south of Taiwan is permissible as self-defence, and that it would not constitute collective self-defence. In 2015, Shinzo Abe's government passed legislation that allowed Japan to engage in collective self-defence in specific cases, such as if an ally like the United States came under attack. In 2021, after his resignation, Abe said that a Chinese attack on Taiwan, or what he referred to as a "Taiwan emergency", would be an emergency for Japan and the US–Japan alliance.

Sanae Takaichi, who was elected as the Prime Minister of Japan in October 2025, has been generally seen as pro-Taiwanese and hawkish on China. In April 2025, she visited Taiwan and met with President Lai Ching-te. She has repeated Abe's statement that a "Taiwan emergency is a Japan emergency." Her election as Liberal Democratic Party (LDP) leader also led Komeito, which maintains friendly ties with China, to break its coalition with the LDP. Chinese leader Xi Jinping made an unusual move by not sending a congratulatory telegram on the day Takaichi assumed the post of prime minister, but a Japan–China summit meeting between Xi and Takaichi took place on 31 October at the APEC South Korea 2025. However, after Takaichi held talks with Taiwan's former Vice Premier Lin Hsin-i on 1 November, China lodged a protest with Japan, and Japan counter-argued, leading to the deterioration of the relationship.

== Dispute ==
During deliberations in the National Diet on 7 November, Japanese prime minister Sanae Takaichi said that a Chinese attack on Taiwan could constitute "an existential crisis for Japan" under the Legislation for Peace and Security formulated in 2015, allowing it to take military action in self-defence. (Note: Original Japanese text: 先ほど有事という言葉がございました。それはいろいろな形がありましょう。例えば、台湾を完全に中国、北京政府の支配下に置くようなことのためにどういう手段を使うか。それは単なるシーレーンの封鎖であるかもしれないし、武力行使であるかもしれないし、それから偽情報、サイバープロパガンダであるかもしれないし、それはいろいろなケースが考えられると思いますよ。だけれども、それが戦艦を使って、そして武力の行使も伴うものであれば、これはどう考えても存立危機事態になり得るケースであると私は考えます。) Under the conditions of Legislation, a survival-threatening situation refers to an attack on a country with close ties to Japan that threatens Japan's survival and poses a clear danger to the lives of its people as a legal prerequisite for Japan exercising its right to collective self-defense, even if Japan itself is not directly attacked.

Japanese: それが戦艦を使って、そして武力の行使も伴うものであれば、これはどう考えても存立危機事態になり得るケースであると私は考えます。

[If it were to involve the use of warships and the exercise of force, then by any measure, it could constitute a situation threatening Japan’s survival.]

— Sanae Takaichi

Takaichi made this remark in response to a question from opposition parliamentarian Katsuya Okada about a hypothetical naval blockade of the Bashi Channel between the Philippines and Taiwan. In response to the comments, the Chinese consul-general in Osaka, Xue Jian, wrote on the social network X that "we have no choice but to cut off that dirty neck that has lunged at us without a moment's hesitation. Are you ready?", (Note: Original Japanese text: 勝手に突っ込んできたその汚い首は一瞬のちゅうちょもなく斬ってやるしかない。覚悟ができているのか) although the post was later deleted after a protest by the Japanese government.

薛剑XueJian
(@xuejianosaka)
tweeted:

Japanese:

勝手に突っ込んできたその汚い首は一瞬の躊躇もなく斬ってやるしかない。覚悟が出来ているのか。😡

Translation:

We have no choice but to cut off that dirty neck that has lunged at us without a moment's hesitation. Are you ready?😡

8 November 2025

This exchange of words led to a diplomatic row between Japan and China. Chinese officials condemned Takaichi's remarks as they cast doubt on Japan's stance regarding the one China principle and constitutes interference in China's internal affairs, while Japanese officials and the US ambassador to Japan criticized Xue's comment. The Taiwanese government attempted to keep a low profile regarding the conflict, with the opposition parties displaying mixed attitudes. During further discussion in Parliament on 12 November, Takaichi said that her remarks were in accord with the government's longstanding position and would not be withdrawn. She also said that she would refrain from making statements about specific cases in the future.

=== Follow-up exchanges ===
On 13 November, Chinese deputy foreign minister Sun Weidong summoned the Japanese ambassador to China, Kenji Kanasugi, to protest Sanae Takaichi's remarks. Kanasugi rejected the Chinese argument, explained the Japanese position, and protested Consul General Xue Jian's remarks. On 14 November, Japanese Vice-Minister for Foreign Affairs Takehiro Funakoshi summoned the Chinese ambassador to Japan, Wu Jianghao, to protest Xue Jian's remarks. According to press releases by the Japanese and Chinese Ministries of Foreign Affairs, Wu said Takaichi's remarks were "complete misjudgment of the situation and an overestimation of Japan's capabilities" while "Funakoshi countered these statements based on the Japanese government's consistent and long-standing position."

Permanent Representative of China to the United Nations Fu Cong's letter to United Nations Secretary General António Guterres regarding China's position on Takaichi's remarks (2025)

On 17 November, Masaaki Kanai, Director-general of the Asian and Oceanian Affairs Bureau of Japan's Ministry of Foreign Affairs, arrived in China and met with Liu Jinsong, Director-general of the Department of Asian Affairs of the Chinese Ministry of Foreign Affairs on 18 November. During the meeting, Liu protested Takaichi's remarks and requested that they be retracted. Kanai responded by saying Japan's security policy did not change and protested Consul General Xue Jian's remarks and criticized China's moves to limit the movement of people between the two countries. After the meeting, the Chinese side took the unusual step of allowing reporters into the Ministry of Foreign Affairs building to take pictures. Chinese media published pictures of Liu, who was wearing a Chinese tunic suit in the style of the May Fourth Movement and had the national emblem pinned to his chest, speaking, while Kanai listened with his head down, a move considered by Nippon Television to be China trying to manipulate public opinion. Japanese Chief Cabinet Secretary Minoru Kihara said that the Chinese side had unilaterally permitted photography without agreement from Japan.

On 18 November, at the plenary session of the United Nations General Assembly on Security Council reform, Fu Cong, China's Permanent Representative to the United Nations, said Japan was "totally unqualified to demand a permanent seat on the Security Council". A Japanese representative described Fu's accusations as groundless and said Tokyo had contributed to maintaining peace and prosperity in the world. On 22 November, Fu delivered a letter to the UN Secretary-General António Guterres to be distributed to all UN member states which said if Japan were to intervene militarily in the event of a war between China and Taiwan, it would constitute an act of aggression and that China would exercise its right of self-defense under the UN Charter and international law. In an emailed statement to Reuters, Japan's Foreign Ministry said it was aware of Fu's letter for the claim of military intervention which is "entirely unacceptable" and reiterated the country's commitment to peace.

On 24 November, Japanese Ambassador to the UN Kazuyuki Yamazaki wrote a letter to Secretary-General Guterres, stating China's assertions were "erroneous" and that Japan's defense policy is exclusively defense-oriented, while also criticizing China's military build-up. He also stated Japan's position on Taiwan had not changed. On 1 December, Fu sent a second letter to Secretary-General Guterres as a reply to Yamazaki's letter, in which he wrote that Takaichi's statement was the "greatest challenge" which damaged relations between the two countries, and said Japan should "clearly reaffirm the one-China principle, immediately retract the erroneous remarks and take practical steps to honor its commitments to China". He also called on the international community to "remain highly vigilant against Japan's ambitions to expand its military capabilities and revive militarism". In response, Chief Cabinet Secretary Kihara called China's allegations "not true at all" and "totally unacceptable", saying Japan has "consistently contributed to the peace and prosperity" since the end of World War II. On 4 December, Japanese ambassador Yamazaki again issued a rebuttal, calling China's assertions "inconsistent with the facts, unsubstantiated, and are categorically unacceptable".

On 15 December, at an open debate of the UN Security Council regarding leadership for peace, Fu urged Takaichi to withdraw her remarks, saying they had "gone against the trend", and said Japan had launched aggression 80 years ago "in the name of self-defense, bringing profound catastrophes" to China and Asia, saying that the world "must never allow the resurgence of militarism and fascism". Yamazaki replied by saying Japan had consistently pursued the path of a peace-loving nation since the end of World War II and that China's comments were not appropriate for the Security Council's agenda. On 26 January 2026, Fu addressed a UN Security Council meeting on international rule of law by stating Takaichi's remarks constitute a "brazen intervention in China's internal affairs" and are an open breach of Japan's obligations as a country defeated in World War II, to which Japanese representative Kazuyuki responded by saying it was "regrettable" that the Chinese delegation made groundless statements against Japan. On 18 February, Fu said that Japan was "attempting to intervene militarily in the Taiwan issue under the guise of collective self-defence", which he said "would constitute an aggression against China".

On 18 May 2026, members of the Japan–China Friendship Parliamentarians' Union, including Chairman Yu Moriyama, dined with Ambassador Wu Jianghao at the Chinese Embassy in Japan. On 22 June, after attending the China International Supply Chain Promotion Expo, Gaku Hashimoto, acting chairman of the Japan International Trade Promotion Association and member of the House of Representatives, held a meeting with Hua Chunying, vice minister of the Chinese Ministry of Foreign Affairs, for about an hour. He was the first member of the Japanese National Diet to meet with a high-ranking Chinese government official since the beginning of the diplomatic crisis. The next day, when meeting with reporters, Gaku Hashimoto said, "We have found a way to communicate, which is a great achievement." Guo Jiakun, spokesperson for the Ministry of Foreign Affairs, said that during the meeting, Hua Chunying expressed her condolences for the death of Yōhei Kōno and stated her position on issues such as Sino–Japanese relations. She hoped that the Japanese business community would make positive efforts to promote the Japanese government to improve Sino–Japanese relations. Hua Chunying also welcomed the Japanese trade promotion delegation to visit China again. In the same month, Kubota Masakazu, vice chairman of the Japan Business Federation, exchanged views with local business groups when attending the Summer Davos Forum in Dalian and said that "the conditions for restarting the delegation's visit to China have been met."

On 22 July, Chinese Foreign Minister Wang Yi and Japanese Foreign Minister Toshimitsu Motegi attended a series of ASEAN meetings in the Philippines. Wang Yi was absent from the dinner, the ASEAN Plus Three (China, Japan and South Korea) Foreign Ministers’ Meeting, the East Asia Summit and the ASEAN Regional Forum Foreign Ministers’ Meeting attended by Motegi. On 23 July, Motegi told reporters that he had a brief conversation with Wang Yi, who had just finished the ASEAN Plus Three Foreign Ministers’ Meeting, when he entered the venue before the start of the ASEAN Plus Three Foreign Ministers’ Meeting. They talked about Sino–Japanese relations without the help of interpreters. Lin Jian, a spokesperson for the Chinese Ministry of Foreign Affairs, said at a press conference on the same day that “Foreign Minister Wang Yi has no arrangements to meet with the Japanese side.” On 25 July, China Global Television Network said that Wang Yi did not talk with the Japanese side. On 27 July, Lin Jian said that “there was no brief exchange on site.”

From 24 to 27 August, a cross-party delegation of Japanese parliamentarians, consisting of Shinichi Isa, a member of the House of Representatives from the Centrist Reform Alliance, Gaku Hashimoto, a member from the Liberal Democratic Party, and Yudai Kawamura, a member of the House of Representatives from Komeito, visited Beijing as the first such delegation since the diplomatic incident. The delegation visited robots, autonomous driving, and the Xiong'an New Area, and exchanged views with scholars from the Institute of Japanese Studies of the Chinese Academy of Social Sciences. Both sides mentioned that the trip was initiated by several Japanese parliamentarians who wanted to visit China to seek dialogue. Hiroyuki Konishi, a member of the House of Councillors from the Chiba at-large district and a member of the Constitutional Democratic Party of Japan, who was originally scheduled to attend, canceled his plans due to the Chiba rainstorm. Gaku Hashimoto returned to Japan midway through the visit. The delegation met Lu Kang, Deputy Head of the International Department of the Chinese Communist Party. The meeting on 27 August lasted for about two hours. Lu Kang said the "relations are in serious difficulty, and the root cause is clear" and said he hoped Japanese politicians could urge the nation's leadership to "handle the Taiwan issue honestly and earnestly according to the One-China principle". He added that as long as Japanese Prime Minister Sanae Takaichi's parliamentary response to Taiwan in November of last year and her understanding of Taiwan remain unchanged, China will not change its policy toward Japan and will demand that Japan withdraw its response to Taiwan. Isa proposed to restart youth and cultural exchanges between Japan and China.

From 13 to 15 September, eight young members of the Japan–China Friendship Parliamentarians' Union visited China, led by LDP member and former Vice Minister of Justice, Masahiro Kōmura. On 14 September, the delegation met with Assistant Minister of Foreign Affairs Liu Bin and Yang Wanming, President of the Chinese People's Association for Friendship with Foreign Countries, in Beijing. Komura said that being able to meet directly with officials of the Ministry of Foreign Affairs was an important step forward. During the talks, he raised issues such as rare earth minerals that the Japanese people were concerned about, and hoped that the contact between the two sides could develop into an intergovernmental dialogue. The Chinese side urged the Japanese side to correct its mistakes and abide by the principles and spirit of the four political documents between China and Japan.

From 27 to 30 September, a roughly 50-member delegation of Japan's Association for the Promotion of International Trade led by former foreign minister Takeshi Iwaya visited China. The visit was postponed because former Chairman Yōhei Kōno, who was originally scheduled to visit China, passed away in June. On 28 September, Iwaya met with Chinese foreign minister Wang Yi at the Great Hall of the People for about an hour, with the opening remarks being made public to the media. Iwaya said "Current Sino-Japanese relations are once again facing a severe situation, requiring normalization once more" and noted that 2027 marks the 55th anniversary of diplomatic ties between the two nations. He said that "A country that challenges its post-war ‘peace constitution’ or attempts to rewrite the history of wartime aggression … cannot face the world, let alone open up a future" and urged Japan to "correct the erroneous words and deeds" of its leadership regarding Taiwan. He also called on Japan to "learn from historical lessons" on the 80th anniversary of the Tokyo Trials. Iwaya said that the state of the current relations was "worrying", and that his organization would honor the legacy of Yōhei Kōno and work to return the relations back to the principles of the four foundational bilateral documents. Iwaya also met with Chinese vice premier He Lifeng on 29 September, who hoped Iwaya's assocition would "adhere to the correct historical direction and carry forward the tradition of friendship with China" and praised Japan as an economic and trade partner, welcoming Japanese companies. Iwaya called on China to ensure appropriate controls on exports of critical minerals including rare earths to Japan; He replied by saying that China would restrict crticial material exports for military use but allow them for civilian purposes. On the same day, the delegation met with Vice Minister of Commerce Yan Dong and asked China to expedite the approval process for the export of rare earth minerals.

At the press conference, Iwaya said that China’s attitude toward economic and people-to-people exchanges with Japan was positive, not negative. He also emphasized that Japanese Ambassador to China Kenji Kanasugi had also participated in the talks, so the content of the talks had been conveyed to the Japanese government. The Sankei Shimbun called the treatment of Iwaya by China this time "an unusually high-level reception". Iwaya later said on 7 October that Wang had agreed about the necessity of improving the relations between the two nations, and that he explained to Wang that Japanese government's stance on Taiwan had not changed. Iwaya said that he proposed two governments reaffirmed the 1972 Japan–China Joint Communiqué, which would amount to a "de facto withdrawal" of Takaichi’s remarks, explaining to Wang that an actual withdrawal faces very high political costs; he said that Wang rejected the argument by citing a Chinese saying meaning that the person who caused a problem should be the one to resolve it. Iwaya also said he called on China to not refer to Japan's expanding military capabilities as "neo-militarism".

==== APEC China 2026 ====
Prime Minister Sanae Takaichi arriving at Shenzhen to attend APEC China 2026, 18 November 2026

The APEC 2026 Leaders Summit was hosted by China from 18 to 19 November 2026, located in Shenzhen, China. As the host nation, Chinese leader Xi Jinping presided over the summit with attendance by leadership of APEC member states. Nikkei Asia speculated that Xi Jinping may extend an invitation to Sanae Takaichi in order secure CCP legitimacy ahead of the 21st National Congress of the Chinese Communist Party and highlight Xi Jinping as a "eminent global leader". The Yomiuri Shimbun reported that Japanese government has tried to set up a face-to-face summit between Xi and Sanae Takaichi at the November APEC 2026 summit in China. Yomiuri has reported that Chinese authorities have consistently declined contact with officials from the Japanese government, while personnel at the Japanese Embassy in China have, in most cases, been unable to secure meetings with Chinese counterparts. The Japanese ambassador to China Kenji Kanasugi vowed "best effort" to arrange a leaders' summit at APEC between Xi Jinping and Sanae Takaichi, adding a meeting between the two leaders is "very important" as a breakthrough for thawing ties.

On 15 May 2026, Hitoshi Kawada, Minister of State for Special Missions (Co-operative Representative for Women and Men) of the Cabinet Office of Japan, attended the APEC Ministerial Meeting on Women and Economy held in Shanghai. He was the first Japanese cabinet minister to visit China after the diplomatic incident, but he did not meet with Chinese officials. In the first ever ministerial meeting between Japan and China since the diplomatic crisis started, Japanese top trade minister Akazawa Ryosei reached out to briefly chat with Chinese counterpart Wang Wentao on the sidelines of the 2026 APEC trade ministers meeting in Suzhou, China, However, these talks were not considered formal talks, only a short conversation with no substantive discussions. At the same time, Japanese Vice Minister of Foreign Affairs Iwao Horii also revealed that he had contact with Wang Wentao on the evening of 22 May. As the Japanese government continues to attempt to arrange a meeting between the two leaders at APEC summit, China remains unresponsive. China has maintained its stance of refusing dialogue unless Prime Minister Takaichi retracts her Diet remarks. At the food security ministers’ meeting in August and the energy ministers’ meeting in September, Japanese officials also said they had brief conversations with Chinese officials.

Chinese leader Xi Jinping and his wife Peng Liyuan taking a photo with Japanese Prime Minister Sanae Takaichi during the APEC welcoming ceremony, 18 November 2026

According to a report by the South China Morning Post on 8 October 2026, the Japanese government expressed to the Chinese side in September 2026 its hope to arrange a meeting between Xi and Takaichi at the APEC summit, but the Chinese side refused. The Chinese side suggested arranging a meeting between Premier Li Qiang and Takaichi, but the Japanese government said it would not accept it. At the end of October, Foreign Minister Toshimitsu Motegi said that he was coordinating the participation of Sanae Takaichi in the APEC summit, but did not say whether she would meet with Xi. In November 2026, Kyodo News quoted several sources from China–Japan relations as saying that China still refused to hold formal talks with Takaichi, and Japan may become the only country among the major participating countries in this summit that did not hold bilateral talks with Xi. According to Japanese media citing Japanese diplomats, Takaichi's answer could not be retracted, and going to Shenzhen to attend the meeting "did not mean that she had to bow down and meet with the Chinese leadership." The spokesperson of the Ministry of Foreign Affairs of China has repeatedly stated that China has demanded that Takaichi retract her relevant remarks, otherwise they would refuse to engage in dialogue.

On 13 November 2026, the Japanese government announced that Takaichi would travel to Shenzhen on 18 November to attend the APEC summit. According to Kyodo News, Japan was seeking an opportunity for the Chinese and Japanese leaders to shake hands or have brief contact at the APEC event and trying to avoid being snubbed during the meeting. Bloomberg News quoted an insider as saying that Japanese officials had sought assurances from the Chinese side that Xi would treat Takaichi with the same courtesy as other leaders, and said that Japan would protest if there were any "unusual arrangements". Another insider said that the possibility of the Chinese and Japanese leaders meeting during the APEC summit was unlikely, and that their contact would be limited to routine interactions, such as leaders' dinners. Some scholars believe that the possibility of Takaichi and Xi Jinping having formal talks is low, but there is still a possibility of brief, informal exchanges between the two sides. On 17 November 2026, during the ASEAN and China–Japan–South Korea Leaders' Meeting in Manila, Philippines, Takaichi shook hands and had a brief conversation with Han Jun, China's Minister of Agriculture and Rural Affairs. This was the first time she had publicly interacted with a Chinese government official since the start of the diplomatic crisis.

Prime Minister Sanae Takaichi shaking hands with Chinese leader Xi Jinping before the attending the APEC Leaders' Meeting, 19 November 2026

On 18 November, Takaichi arrived in Shenzhen to attend the 2026 APEC Leaders' Summit, where she was greeted by Zhang Qiyue, the former Chinese ambassador to Greece. In contrast, many of the leaders attending the APEC meeting were greeted by Huang Chuping, chairman of the Standing Committee of the Guangdong Provincial People's Congress, and Lin Keqing, chairman of the Guangdong Provincial Committee of the Chinese People's Political Consultative Conference. The Chinese side did not arrange a welcoming ceremony with a crowd cheering to music at the airport, and the scale of the welcome was smaller than that of other leaders attending the meeting. When he arrived on a Japanese government exclusive aircraft, there was a gap of about 40 centimeters between the aircraft and the boarding stairs. Since the prime minister has rheumatoid arthritis and an artificial joint in one leg, there had been a series of concerns raised about the potential danger. Before the APEC leaders took a group photo, she shook hands with Xi. This was the first interaction between the two since the diplomatic incident. Takaichi said a few words to Xi, but Xi only smiled and did not respond. After the group photo, Takaichi and Xi nodded to each other when she left. On the morning of 19 November, Takaichi talked to Xi again and shook hands, but Xi did not respond. That afternoon, Takaichi finished her trip and held a press conference, saying that "the status of the four basic documents between China and Japan remains unchanged" and expressed her gratitude for Xi's invitation.

== Chinese retaliatory measures ==
=== Military ===
On 15 November, the China Maritime Safety Administration announced that the People's Liberation Army would conduct live-fire exercises in the central Yellow Sea from 17 to 19 November, and that navigation in this area would be prohibited during this period. The notice drew criticism from Taiwan, which accused Beijing of saber-rattling at Japan for political gain. On 16 November, the China Coast Guard announced that a formation of its ships carried out a patrol within the territorial waters of the Senkaku Islands, a territory disputed between China Japan, and Taiwan. The Japan Coast Guard said it drove the ships away. On 2 December, Chinese and Japanese coastguard vessels engaged in a standoff over the islands. China said it had implemented "necessary control measures" and driven a Japanese fishing boat away from the islands, while Japan stated it had intercepted and driven away two Chinese coastguard vessels that approached the fishing boat.

From 6 to 7 December, the aircraft carrier Liaoning transited through the Miyako Strait between the islands of Okinawa and Miyakojima and began takeoff and landing drills with Shenyang J-15 jets; aircraft took off from and landed on the carrier roughly 100 times over two days. On 7 December, Japanese defense minister Shinjirō Koizumi accused China of two incidents on 6 December in which J-15 jets from the Liaoning carrier at locking their fire-control radar at Japanese F-15 jets near the Miyako Strait. The Japanese government formally protested to the Chinese side. Takaichi also called the incident "extremely disappointing". Japanese vice foreign minister Takehiro Funakoshi summoned Chinese ambassador Wu Jianghao over the incident; for his part, Wu lodged "stern representation and strong protest" to Japan at the meeting. The PLA Navy spokesperson Wang Xuemeng responded by accusing Japan of a "slander and smear campaign" and said the Liaoning was carrying "routine carrier-based fighter jet flight training". He also said Japan Self-Defense Forces aircraft had repeatedly approached and disrupted its fighter jet training. Japanese officials later said that their Chinese counterparts didn't answer the hotline during the incident. Koizumi also said that while notified, Japan "did not receive sufficient information" regarding the drills, while Kihara said Japanese jets were far away from the Chinese jets while training. The U.S. criticized the radar targeting of Japanese aircraft and reinforced the U.S. alliance with Japan. A US State Department spokesperson also stated that "China’s actions are not conducive to regional peace and stability".

The aircraft carrier group travelled northeast from their position east of Kikaijima following the incident. A Chinese naval Type 054 frigate also sailed through the Miyako Strait on 8 December, while another travelled through the Osumi Strait. On 9 December, two Russian Tupolev Tu-95 bombers, two Chinese Xi'an H-6 bombers and four Chinese Shenyang J-16 fighter jets flew through the Miyako Strait into the Pacific Ocean as part of joint exercises. On 10 December, two US B-52 bombers flew together with three Japanese F-35 jets and three F-15 jets, which Japanese defense ministry said "reaffirmed their strong resolve to prevent any unilateral attempt to change the status quo by force". On 29 December, the PLA's Eastern Theater Command announced a major military exercise around Taiwan codenamed Justice Mission 2025, involving the command's land, sea, air, and rocket forces. On 27 January 2026, Reuters reported that since late 2025, the Japanese government had been advising fishers to avoid the Senkaku Islands in order to not escalate relations with China. On 13 February, the Japanese government announced it had seized a Chinese fishing boat in Japan's exclusive economic zone near Nagasaki Prefecture. Japan subsequently released the captain of the ship after China submitted documents guaranteeing payment of bail.

=== Cultural exchange ===
On 16 November, the Japanese think tank Genron NPO stated the 20th Beijing–Tokyo Summit and the release of the results of a joint Sino-Japanese opinion poll would be postponed after it received a request for cancellation from its Chinese partner, the China International Communications Group, in which it blamed Takaichi's remarks for undermining the atmosphere for normal exchanges between the two countries. A delegation from Xuzhou, Jiangsu cancelled its visit to its sister city, Handa, Aichi. On 17 November, the release of Japanese films Crayon Shin-chan the Movie: Super Hot! The Spicy Kasukabe Dancers and Cells at Work!, which were originally scheduled to be released in China, were temporarily postponed. The decision was made by the China Film Administration, which it said was based on a reassessment of the overall market outlook of Japanese film imports and sentiment of Chinese audiences, and that it had paused the approval process for new movies from Japan. Hong Kong's public broadcaster RTHK also stopped airings of Cells at Work! On the same evening, QQ Music announced the cancellation of a JO1 fan meeting that was scheduled to be held in Guangzhou. At the end of November 2025, a "latest notice" from Shanghai circulated on Weibo, which allegedly prohibited underground idols from singing Japanese songs and required them to sing Chinese songs. Dance performances could only play Chinese songs, and the policy was fully implemented in early December. In July 2026, relevant departments in several districts of Shanghai verbally instructed that songs with Japanese lyrics should not be sung on stage, and some underground idols had to replace Japanese songs with Chinese songs.

On 18 November, the 8th Japan–China Friendship Exchange Conference in the Western Japan Region event originally scheduled to be held by the Consulate General of China in Osaka in Hiroshima on 21 November was cancelled at its request due to security concern. Xue Jian was originally scheduled to attend the conference. On 19 November, a concert by Kokia was cancelled after her band was denied access to their venue. On 25 November, Hong Kong singer Ekin Cheng cancelled a planned performance in Tokyo in December. On the same day, The Asahi Shimbun reported that censors appeared to be removing comments and videos on Chinese social media platforms which expressed views supportive of Japan or that deviated from the government's official line on Takaichi's remarks. On 28 November, Japanese singer Ayumi Hamasaki announced the cancellation of a concert in Shanghai scheduled for 29 November as part of the I Am Ayu Tour; she later performed in front of an empty stage. During an appearance in Shanghai, Japanese singer Maki Otsuki's performance was interrupted mid-song, when the lights and sound were cut, and was asked to leave the stage, followed by the cancellation of a Japanese anime event. Japanese idol girl group Momoiro Clover Z also cancelled a planned performance. In the same day, South China Morning Post reported that China had cancelled youth exchange programs with Japan. In December, CNN estimated that performances and fan meet-and-greets from at least 30 Japanese performers had been canceled. In reporting on the cancellations of events in China featuring Japanese musicians, Reuters noted that the Chinese government had a history of using cultural boycotts against countries as a form of economic coercion during diplomatic disputes.

On 4 December, a Hatsune Miku themed exhibition, which was scheduled to be held in Shanghai from 18 December 2025 to 1 March 2026, was postponed indefinitely. K-pop groups have also been affected by the cultural restrictions, with concerts and fan events featuring groups with Japanese members being cancelled. The activities of the South Korean entertainment company-owned girl group Say My Name, and boy group Hi-Fi Un!corn in China were cancelled. On 6 December, South Korean boy band Close Your Eyes held a fan meeting in Hangzhou without Japanese member Kenshin, while a fan meeting event featuring trainees from Incode Entertainment who starred in Mnet’s Boys II Planet was abruptly canceled; the lineup included two Japanese members. The Le Sserafim's meet-and-greet event for its single "Spaghetti" scheduled for 14 December in Shanghai was cancelled; the group has two Japanese members. On 6 December, Hong Kong's Leisure and Cultural Services Department cancelled the screening of three Japanese films – Kamome Shokudo, Tampopo and Sweet Bean – at the Food for Thought – A Cinematic Feast running from 6 December to 18 January. On 7 December, Chinese video game company miHoYo announced a two-week delay for a major update to their game Honkai: Star Rail, in which a new region widely teased to have Japanese influence was supposed to be released. MiHoYo has apologized to players regarding the delay and issued in-game compensation. On 9 December, Studio Ghibli announced that an exhibition in Guangzhou based on the works of Japanese animator Hayao Miyazaki had been cancelled.

On 10 December, a Pokémon Trading Card Game tournament scheduled for January 2026 in Shanghai was postponed. In December, it was announced that the two pandas at the Ueno Zoo, Xiao Xiao and Lei Lei, would return to China in January 2026, ahead of schedule; they returned to China on 28 January 2026. In the same month, it was also announced that the Comicup comic convention in Hangzhou that would take place from 27 to 28 December would ban Japanese-themed content and derivative works including Japanese anime and manga. On 11 December, Japanese singer Lisa Ono's tour to Hangzhou, Guangzhou and Shenzhen from 19 to 244 December was cancelled. On 18 December 2025, Japanese band Roselia's concert scheduled for 16 to 17 January 2026 was cancelled. On 27 December 2025, Japanese rock group Zutomayo's Shanghai tour scheduled for 28 March 2026 was cancelled. On 30 December 2025, Japanese singer Mika Nakashima's Macau concert scheduled for 14 March 2026 was cancelled. On 13 January, Japanese singer Nana Mizuki's Shanghai concert scheduled for 7 to 8 March was cancelled. On 19 January, Japanese media personality Shoko Nakagawa's 18 March Shanghai event was suddenly cancelled. The South Korean MBC TV station's event Show! Music Core in Macau, scheduled for 7 to 8 February, was cancelled on 28 January because the group that appeared included Japanese members. On 16 February, Japanese signer Koda Kumi had her 21 March concert at the AsiaWorld–Expo in Hong Kong cancelled. On 27 February, Japanese YouTube group HIMEHINA's Shanghai concert scheduled for July was cancelled. On 14 March, Japanese band King Gnu's Shanghai concert scheduled for 13 to 14 June was cancelled. On 9 April, Japanese rock band One Ok Rock had their concert in Hong Kong scheduled for 2 to 3 May cancelled. On 21 April, Japanese singer Fujii Kaze announced his Hong Kong concert was cancelled. On 26 August, Japanese musician Vaundy announced his Shanghai concert scheduled for 14 to 15 November was cancelled.

On 19 March 2026, Japanese civic groups said they had not received an invitation to the cherry blossom friendship forest planting event in Wuxi, Jiangsu. This event had been held since 1988, and this was the first time that Japan has not been invited except in years when infectious diseases are prevalent. On 9 April, Japanese civic groups notified relevant organizations that the 3rd Japan University China Tour Education Exhibition, originally scheduled to begin on 11 April, could not be held due to "force majeure." Sources familiar with the matter revealed that this was due to pressure from Chinese authorities on the event venue. In May, according to multiple media reports, some key Chinese universities suspended their exchange programs with Japan and halted the dispatch of Chinese students to Japan, citing "international environmental impact". In addition, due to the suspension of student exchange programs by some Chinese partner schools, some Japanese students were unable to go to China for exchange. The number of Japanese anime imported by the Chinese video website Bilibili in 2026 was drastically reduced compared to previous years, with only 1 new anime in January, and 0 in April. No Japanese films were screened at the Shanghai International Film Festival in June 2026. The Shanghai Film Festival has never completely banned films from any country before. The publication of related books in Japan has also been restricted, and the issuance of ISBNs has been blocked. No Japanese artists were invited to the Bilibili World exhibition held in Shanghai in July 2026. Lin Quanzhong, a specially appointed researcher in international politics at the Institute of Oriental Culture, University of Tokyo, told Kyodo News on 14 July that he received an invitation from the Center for Japanese Studies at Shanghai Jiao Tong University in early May to attend a lecture on "Looking at Chinese History from the Perspective of Japanese History" to be held at the end of May. However, he received a notice of cancellation a few days before his departure and did not know the reason. He said that "Affected by the deterioration of Sino-Japanese relations, academic activities related to Japan in China have been almost frozen."

=== Travel ===
Chinese authorities' travel warning list for Japan
| Date | Department | Official reason | Ref. |
|---|---|---|---|
| 14 November 2025 | Ministry of Foreign Affairs | Poor public security in Japan and provocative remarks by Japanese leaders regarding Taiwan. | |
| 16 November 2025 | Ministry of Culture and Tourism | Forwarding the Ministry of Foreign Affairs warning | |
| 16 November 2025 | Hong Kong Security Bureau | Forwarding the Ministry of Foreign Affairs warning | |
| 16 November 2025 | Macau Government Tourism Office | Forwarding the Ministry of Foreign Affairs warning | |
| 11 December 2025 | Ministry of Foreign Affairs | 2025 Aomori Earthquake | |
| 26 January 2026 | Ministry of Foreign Affairs | The high incidence of crime against Chinese citizens and earthquakes | |
| 29 January 2026 | Chinese Embassy in Japan | Chinese citizens being robbed on Tokyo streets | |
| 18 February 2026 | Chinese Embassy in Japan | Hong Kong tourists being attacked in Hokkaido | |
| 4 March 2026 | Chinese Embassy in Japan | Incidents related to Japanese "hit-and-run gangs" | |
| 26 March 2026 | Ministry of Foreign Affairs; Chinese Embassy in Japan | Chinese Embassy in Tokyo attack | |
| 22 April 2026 | Chinese Embassy in Japan | 2026 Sanriku earthquake | |

On 14 November, the Ministry of Foreign Affairs and the Ministry of Culture and Tourism advised Chinese citizens to avoid traveling to Japan; Prior to the dispute, China was the largest source of tourists to Japan. Air China (including its subsidiary Air Macau), China Southern Airlines, China Eastern Airlines, Hainan Airlines, Shandong Airlines, Sichuan Airlines, and XiamenAir subsequently announced that tickets for flights to Japan with travel dates before 31 December could be refunded or changed free of charge. On 5 December, they extended this policy for another three months to 28 March. On 26 January 2026, this policy was further extended by seven months, applying to flights to and from Japan as well as transfers scheduled between 29 March and 24 October.

News reports in November 2025 stated that Nanjing Lukou International Airport required all passengers going to Japan to use the manual channel and be questioned by customs officers. On 16 November, both Hong Kong and Macau updated their travel safety guidelines, reminding those who planned to go to or were already in Japan to be vigilant. On the same day, the Ministry of Education warned Chinese citizens to be cautious about going to Japan to study; China is the largest source of foreign students in Japan. On 18 November, Financial Times reported that several state-owned enterprises restricted their employees from travelling to Japan. In reaction to the travel warning, tourism agencies in China received a large number of cancellation requests for group tours to Japan, while others announced the suspension of sales of related tourism products. Some hotels and attractions in Japan received notices of cancellation of reservations by Chinese tourists. On 19 November, the Chinese cruise ship Adora Mediterranea cancelled its planned stop at Hirara Port on Miyako Island on 20 November. On 8 December, the Jian Zhen Hao ferry from Shanghai to Osaka and Kobe was cancelled following a request from the Chinese. Additionally, several universities such as the Fudan University suspended exchange programs with Japan.

Number of flights from mainland China to Japan
| Month | Active flights | Cancelled flights | Cancellation rate | Suspended routes | Ref. |
|---|---|---|---|---|---|
| December 2025 | | | 39.4% | | |
| January 2026 | 2,868 | 2,564 | 47.2% | | |
| February 2026 | 2,670 | 2,514 | 48.5% | 52 | |
| March 2026 | 2,734 | 2,691 | 49.6% | 53 | |
| April 2026 | 2,549 | 1,543 | 37.7% | 30 | |
| May 2026 | 2,642 | 1,592 | 37.6% | 31 | |
| June 2026 | 2,488 | 1,488 | 37.5% | 25 | |
| July 2026 | 2,611 | 1,195 | 31.4% | 12 | |
| August 2026 | 2,601 | 1,120 | 30.1% | 18 | |

The Nikkei 225 of the Tokyo Stock Exchange fell on the morning of 17 November, with Fast Retailing, which is related to the Chinese market, and Mitsukoshi Isetan, which is related to overseas tourist spending, experiencing significant declines. Travel statistics cited by The Washington Post, Sankei Shimbun and Bloomberg News estimated that about 543,000 airline tickets from China to Japan – representing around 40% of total Chinese airline bookings and 20% of China-Japan flight routes – were cancelled by 20 November and that around 30% of the 1.44 million planned trips from China to Japan through the end of December had been cancelled. The outlets also cited economic analyses which estimated a loss of $500 million–$1.2 billion to the Japanese economy as a result of the cancellations; if the travel boycotts persisted, they said those loses could rise from $9 billion to over $11 billion (¥1.79 trillion yen, equivalent to 0.29% of Japan's GDP). On 24 November, Yicai reported that Chinese airlines had cancelled 41 flights across the 12 routes. On 25 November, Bloomberg News reported that Chinese government instructed airlines to reduce the number of flights to Japan through March 2026. By 29 November, Nikkei Asia estimated Chinese airlines had canceled 904 flights for December, 16% of the initial total of 5,548, which was equivalent to around 156,000 seats. On 1 December, the China Central Television reported that more than 1,900 flights from mainland China to Japan for December, representing 40% of the total flights, had been cancelled.

Statistics on tourists from mainland China visiting Japan
| Month | Tourists | YoY growth |
|---|---|---|
| October 2025 | 715,804 | 22.8% |
| November 2025 | 562,708 | 3.0% |
| December 2025 | 330,435 | -45.3% |
| January 2026 | 385,519 | -60.7% |
| February 2026 | 396,511 | -45.2% |
| March 2026 | 291,686 | -55.9% |
| April 2026 | 330,776 | -56.8% |
| May 2026 | 313,123 | -60.4% |
| June 2026 | 340,803 | -57.3% |
| July 2026 | 428,200 | -56.1% |
| August 2026 | 418,000 | -59.0% |

In reporting on the travel warning issued by the Chinese government, NHK pointed out that China often used economic pressure as a means of diplomatic friction, such as the boycott of Japanese goods in 2012 and the ban on Korean entertainment in 2017. Decrease in Chinese tourism to Japan has also been marked by a corresponding increase of bookings by Chinese tourists to locations such as South Korea and Russia. In December, the Japan National Tourism Organization revealed that arrivals from China in November had increased just 3% from the same period in 2024, compared to an increase of 40.7% in the first ten months of 2025. The figures also showed that the number of arrivals had dropped from 716,700 in October to 562,600 in November. Bloomberg News calculated that this had led to an economic loss of $367 million (¥57 billion). On 22 December, Flight Manager analyzed that flights across 46 routes covering a total of 38 airports had been cancelled by Chinese airlines for the upcoming two weeks. On 25 December, Nippon Television reported the Chinese government had instructed domestic travel agencies to reduce the number of people visiting Japan to 60% of levels to date.

On 20 January 2026, Japan's Ministry of Land, Infrastructure, Transport and Tourism announced that the number of tourists from China in December 2025 had fallen further to 330,000. down 45% from the same month a year earlier. On 26 January, China's foreign ministry warned its citizens from visiting Japan during the Chinese New Year, citing "a surge in crimes targeting Chinese citizens" and earthquakes. In January 2026, 385,300 people from China visited Japan, representing a decline of 60.7% from the same period in 2025. In February 2026, 396,400 people from China visited Japan, marking a decline of 45.2% from last year. In March 2026, 291,600 people from China visited Japan, which was a decline of 55.9% from last year. In the same month, there were 2,711 flights between the two countries, down from 5,512 flights in March 2025. On the other hand, Kyodo News reported in April that a manager of a major Japanese travel agency revealed that due to the reduction in Sino–Japanese flights, the number of Japanese tourists to China has decreased by 90%.

=== Trade ===
Statistics on China's rare earth magnet exports to Japan
| Month | Export volume (tons) | MoM growth |
|---|---|---|
| January 2026 | 221.066 | |
| February 2026 | 222.584 | 0.7% |
| March 2026 | 184.162 | -17.3% |
| April 2026 | 188.735 | 2.5% |
| May 2026 | 123.525 | -34.6% |

On 17 November, the mayor of Shimonoseki cancelled his planned business trip to Suzhou after receiving a request for postponements from Chinese officials the day before. On 19 November, Kyodo News and other media reported that China informed Japan through diplomatic channels that it would temporarily halt imports of Japanese seafood. Sources told Kyodo News that China stated it was necessary to monitor the testing procedures for the treated water at the Fukushima Daiichi Nuclear Power Plant. However, China did not state how long it would take for the "improvements to be completed". Spokesperson Mao Ning also confirmed the news, but did not mention that it was for the purpose of boycott. She only said that, to her knowledge, it was because China had not yet received technical data from Japan. She added that under the current circumstances, there was "no market" for Japanese seafood imports. On the same day, Kyodo News reported that intergovernmental consultations to resume Japanese beef exports to China were suspended.

Japanese guests and media were prohibited from the biannual Aero Asia show of the Zhuhai International Airshow Center starting on 27 November. On 28 November, Japan Business Federation Chairman Tsutsui Yoshinobu met with Chinese ambassador Wu Jianghao, telling him Japanese businesses hoped to promote smooth exchanges with China and build good relations. On 30 November, The Nikkei reported that Liu Jinsong visited a major Japanese manufacturer in Dalian to assure the company to feel safe while conducting business. On 7 December, Yomiuri Shimbun reported that Japanese companies had faced delays in securing the approval process for importing rare earths from China. On 31 December, the Japan–China Economic Association announced that a delegation of around 200 business leaders will skip a trip originally scheduled 20 January, first time the trip was skipped since 2012 and 2020, the latter due to the COVID-19 pandemic.

On 6 January 2026, the Ministry of Commerce announced that all dual-use items are banned from being exported to Japan for military use effective immediately. In reaction, Japanese vice foreign minister Takehiro Funakoshi summoned Chinese ambassador Wu Jianghao to lodge a strong protest and demand the withdrawal of the sanctions; Wu rejected the demand, calling the restrictions "completely justified, reasonable and lawful". Ministry of Commerce spokesperson He Yadong stated the restrictions were aimed at "Japanese military users, for military purposes, and for any other end-use applications that contribute to enhancing Japan's military capabilities" in order to "preventing remilitarization and attempts to acquire nuclear weapons", and said it would not affect nonmilitary trade. On 7 January, the Ministry of Commerce launched a dumping probe into dichlorosilane imports from Japan. On 8 January, The Wall Street Journal reported China had started restricting exports of rare earth materials to Japan. On the same day, Kyodo News reported that Chinese customs were delaying the clearance of Japanese sake and food items imports to China. By June 2026, Chinese exports of terbium and dysprosium oxide to Japan since November 2025 was at zero and only a small shipment of yttrium oxide was exported to Japan. On 8 September 2026, the Ministry of Commerce announced that companies would be required to provide cash deposits of up to 99.2% when importing dichlorosilane from Japan.

On 24 February 2026, the Ministry of Commerce announced that 20 companies were to be placed on the export control list, and 20 more companies separately on the export control watch list. On 29 June 2026, the Ministry of Commerce added an additional 20 Japanese companies on the export control list, and an additional 20 Japanese companies separately on the export control watch list.

Companies listed on the 24 February 2026 Chinese export control announcements
| Companies subject to dual-use export prohibition | Companies on dual-use export watchlist |
|---|---|
| One subsidiary of Fujitsu: Fujitsu Defense & National Security; Six subsidiaries of IHI Corporation: IHI Power Systems, IHI Master Metal, IHI Jet Service, IHI Aerospace, IHI Aero Manufacturing, IHI Aerospace Engineering: Japan Aerospace Exploration Agency; Japan Marine United, including: JMU Defense Systems; Two subsidiaries of Kawasaki Heavy Industries: Kawasaki Aerospace Systems Company, Kawaju Gifu Engineering; Six subsidiaries of Mitsubishi Heavy Industries: MHI Shipbuilding, MHI Aero Engines, MHI Marine Machinery & Equipment, MHI Engine & Turbocharger, MHI Maritime Systems, MHI Aerospace Systems: National Defense Academy of Japan; Two subsidiaries of NEC: NEC Network and Sensor Systems, NEC Aerospace Systems | ASPP Co. Ltd.; ENEOS; Hino Motors; Institute of Science Tokyo; Itochu Aviation, subsidiary of Itochu; Leda Group Holdings; Mitsubishi Materials; Mitsui Bussan Aerospace, subsidiary of Mitsui & Co.; Nacalai Tesque; Nissin Electric; Nitto Denko; NOF Corporation; Subaru Corporation, including Fuji Aerospace Technology; Sumitomo Heavy Industries; Sun Tectro; TDK; Tokin Corporation; Yashima Denki; Yusoki Co. Ltd. |

Companies listed on the 29 June 2026 Chinese export control announcements
| Companies subject to dual-use export prohibition | Companies on dual-use export watchlist |
|---|---|
| National Institute for Defense Studies; Three departments of Acquisition, Technology & Logistics Agency: Air Systems Research Center (航空装備研究所); Ground Systems Research Center (陸上装備研究所); Naval Systems Research Center (艦艇装備研究所); Two subsidiaries of Japan Steel Works: Nikko Tokki, Nikko YPK Shoji; Nine subsidiaries of Mitsubishi, including under Mitsubishi Electric and MHI: Mitsubishi Electric Software, Mitsubishi Electric Engineering, Mitsubishi Precision, MHI Oceanincs, MHI Sagami High-Tech, MHI Logitec, Kowa Kogyo, MHI Maritech MHI Special Vehicles Parts Supply & Technical Service: Two subsidiaries of Kawasaki Heavy Industries: Kawajyu Gifu Manufacturing (KHI Gifu Works), NIPPI Corporation; Fortunio Co. Ltd.; Aoki Seimitsu Kogyo | Two subsidiaries of Mitsui & Co.: Mitsui E&S; Mitsui Bussan Aerospace Co., Ltd. Maintenance Center; Terra Drone; ACSL Ltd.; Mitsubishi Nuclear Fuel, subsidiary of MHI; Japan Nuclear Fuel Limited; Fujitsu Network Solutions, subsidiary of Fujitsu; Hitachi Advanced Systems, subsidiary of Hitachi; Two subsidiaries of Komatsu Limited: Komatsu Industries Corporation, Komatsu NTC Ltd.; Oki Electric Industry and four of its subsidiaries: OKI Com-Echoes, OKI Circuit Technology, OKI Nextech, OKI Engineering; YDK Technologies; Nihon Denji Sokki; Howa Machinery; Hosoya Pyro-Engineering; Fujikura Parachute, subsidiary of Fujikura |

=== Security ===
On 15 November, the Ministry of State Security announced that it recently "cracked a series of espionage cases involving Japanese intelligence agencies infiltrating and stealing secrets from China" and criticized Takaichi for "persisting in her erroneous remarks without remorse despite repeated solemn representations from China". According to Changanjie Zhishi, a social media account run by the Beijing Daily, the MSS has been actively taking action against the frequent cases of Japanese espionage in recent years.

== Japanese measures ==
On 17 November, the Japanese Embassy in China reminded Japanese people in China to take safety precautions and avoid crowded places where Japanese people are gathered. On 18 November, Japan's Ministry of Education, Culture, Sports, Science and Technology issued a notice requiring Japanese schools in China to ensure the safety of children, students and international students. Japan's chief cabinet secretary Kihara said the advisories were made in response to a surge in anti-Japanese sentiment in the Chinese media.

== Reactions in China and Japan ==
=== China ===
==== Government ====
On 10 November, Chinese Ministry of Foreign Affairs spokesperson Lin Jian protested Takaichi's remarks, saying China had lodged a complaint with Japan over her remarks and that Japan needed to reflect on its historical crimes and stop interfering in China's internal affairs. He also defended Xue's post by saying it was a personal one and that China would not tolerate any foreign interference when it came to Taiwan. Citing the Mukden incident of 1931, the Chinese embassy in Japan noted that Japan had invaded its neighbours including China under the pretext of "existential crisis". The embassy also stated on 21 November that China could invoke the enemy state clauses in the UN Charter, implying possible military action against Japan. On 14 November, Ministry of National Defense spokesperson Jiang Bin said that if Japan intervened in a war between China and Taiwan, then it would suffer a crushing defeat by the People's Liberation Army. Each of PLA's five theater commands have also released statements condemning Takaichi. On 16 November, foreign ministry spokesperson Mao Ning said Premier Li Qiang had no plans to meet with Takaichi during the upcoming G20 summit in South Africa; Japan had reportedly tried to arrange a Takaichi-Li meeting on the sidelines of the summit to reduce tensions between the two countries. While citing the 1972 Japan–China Joint Communiqué, Mao further called on Japan to abide by its commitment to China over Taiwan and for Takaichi to retract her comments.

On 20 November, China's Ministry of Commerce spokesperson He Yongqian said trade cooperation with Japan had been "severely damaged" and urged Takaichi to retract her comments. On the same day, Mao announced the cancellation of a meeting between culture ministers that was scheduled for November with South Korea and Japan. On 22 November, Chinese Foreign Minister Wang Yi said Takaichi's comments crossed a red line which demanded a resolute response from China and that all countries had a responsibility to prevent the resurgence of Japanese militarism. He additionally said that China would never allow Japanese right-wing forces to turn back the tide of history, foreign forces to encroach on China's Taiwan area, and a revival of Japanese militarism, which was picked by Chinese state media as the "Three Never Allows". On 24 November, Hong Kong Chief Executive John Lee Ka-chiu criticized Takaichi's remarks and said they had caused his government to cast doubt on the value of exchanges between China and Japan. Hong Kong also halted exchanges with Japan's consulate and canceled several official events with the country. In addition to statements made in person or on a government website, Chinese officials made posts on X targeting Japan and Takaichi. The X accounts of the Chinese Ministry of Foreign Affairs and the Ministry of National Defense issued warnings in both English and Japanese to Japan. On 24 November, Chinese leader Xi Jinping and President Trump held a phone call, where Xi said "China and the United States once fought side by side against fascism and militarism, and should now work together to safeguard the outcomes of World War II" and that the retrocession of Taiwan was an "integral part of the post-World War II international order", while the Chinese readout stated Trump "understands how important the Taiwan question is to China."

During a call with French presidential policy advisor Emmanuel Bonne on 27 November and a talk with United Kingdom security advisor Jonathan Powell on 28 November, Foreign Minister Wang Yi called on both countries to abide by the one-China principle and called on them to "safeguard the outcomes" of World War II. Wang also condemned Takaichi's statement during his talk with Bonne and elaborated China's position on Japan-related issues to Powell. On 9 December, Wang told German foreign minister Johann Wadephul that Takaichi was "trying to exploit the Taiwan question – the very territory Japan colonized for half a century, committing countless crimes against the Chinese people – to provoke trouble and threaten China militarily", which he said was "completely unacceptable". On 13 December, at the Nanjing Massacre Memorial Day, CCP Organization Department head and Politburo member Shi Taifeng gave a speech saying that under the leadership of the CCP, China had beaten invaders and become a great nation, continuing by saying that "History has proven and will continue to prove that any attempt to revive militarism, challenge the postwar international order, and undermine world peace and stability is doomed to failure". On 14 December, China sent National Health Commission International Cooperation Department director general Feng Yong, a working-level official rather than a minister, to a meeting of health ministers from Japan, China and South Korea in Seoul; the three countries agreed to strengthen trilateral cooperation on universal health coverage and mental health through technology and artificial intelligence. On 15 December, the Chinese foreign minister announced sanctions against former Japanese chief of staff of the joint staff Shigeru Iwasaki for being a consultant to Taiwan's Executive Yuan, saying he had "openly colluded with the ‘Taiwan independence’ separatist forces".

From 12 to 16 December, foreign minister Wang Yi visited the United Arab Emirates, Saudi Arabia and Jordan. Wang later told Chinese media that explained China's position and made clear the country's firm opposition to Takaichi interfering in China's domestic affairs. On 16 December, Chinese foreign ministry spokesperson Guo Jiakun said that "On key issues, Japan is still 'squeezing toothpaste' and 'burying nails,' attempting to obfuscate and muddle through", and that China is "firmly opposed to this". On 17 December, Nippon Television reported that the Chinese foreign ministry had summoned ambassadors from ASEAN countries, including the Philippines and Singapore, to criticize Takaichi's statements and urge them to support China, adding that similar requests were also reportedly made to ambassadors from France, Germany and other countries when they met with the Chinese foreign ministry. In response to the delegation of Japanese parliamentary members’ visit to Taiwan on 22 December, the Chinese foreign ministry lodged "solemn representations with the Japanese side", while foreign ministry spokesperson Lin Jian said that Japanese parliamentarians "paying a visit to China's Taiwan region" were acts that would "seriously violate" the political foundations of the bilateral relationship between China and Japan. On 30 December, Wang Yi told the Symposium on the International Situation and China's Foreign Relations that Takaichi was "openly challenging" China's territorial integrity.

On 1 January 2026, Wang Yi held a call with South Korean foreign minister Cho Hyun, telling him that "certain political forces in Japan" were trying to "reverse the course of history and whitewash" Japan's "crimes of aggression and colonialism". on 8 January, China's Ministry of Foreign Affairs and Ministry of National Defense jointly issued a statement saying that "moves of the Japanese side form a grave challenge to the international nuclear non-proliferation regime based on the Treaty on the Non-Proliferation of Nuclear Weapons and the postwar international order", referring to Japan possibly seeking to revise the Three Non-Nuclear Principles, discussing the potential introduction of nuclear-powered submarines, and calling for boosting "extended deterrence". In January, Chinese embassy in the US spokesperson Liu Pengyu wrote an article in the Executive Intelligence Review, calling for the US and China to work together to prevent the resurgence of Japanese militarism, writing that "Preventing militarism from harming the world again is in the common interest of both our countries". The Chinese foreign ministry further stated that Takaichi's remarks had "severely hurt the feelings of the Chinese people." The New York Times reported in May that when Chinese leader Xi Jinping met with British prime minister Keir Starmer, who was visiting China in late January, he told Starmer that the tensions were entirely Japan's fault. On 14 February, at the Munich Security Conference, Foreign Minister Wang Yi said that Takaichi's remarks was "the first time in 80 years that a Japanese Prime Minister has uttered such words. It directly violates China’s territorial sovereignty, and it directly challenges the fact that Taiwan has been returned to China. It completely violates Japan's commitment to China", and that there was "no way" for China to accept that. In the days following the Japanese general election on 8 February 2026, Spamouflage-linked accounts targeted Sanae Takaichi. On 8 March, Wang Yi stated "If something happens in China’s Taiwan region, what gives Japan the right to exercise the right to self-defence? Does the so-called collective self-defence right mean that Japan intends to hollow out its pacifist constitution, which renounces the right of belligerency?".

On 30 March, China announced sanctions against Keiji Furuya. On 21 April, after Japan relaxed the Three Principles on Transfer of Defence Equipment and Technology, which restricted its exports of arms abroad, Chinese Ministry of Foreign Affairs spokesperson Guo Jiakun expressed "serious concern" and stated the need of "heightened vigilance to resolutely resist Japan’s reckless moves towards new-style militarism". On 29 April, Sun Xiaobo, director of the Arms Control Department of the Ministry of Foreign Affairs, stated "Japan, as a defeated country in World War II, refuses to acknowledge the status. It is pushing to revise its pacifist constitution and Three Non-Nuclear Principles, expand its long-range strike capabilities and have nuclear weapons deployed on its territory by its ally". On 30 April, the Ministry of Foreign Affairs released a document calling on the United Nations Security Council to make Japan's potential pursuit of nuclear arms an "important agenda item" and stating "Japan has long produced and stockpiled plutonium materials far exceeding the actual needs of its civilian nuclear energy programme, giving it the capability to achieve a ‘nuclear breakout’ within a short period" and adding "Allowing right-wing forces in Japan to push for the development of powerful offensive weapons, or even the possession of nuclear weapons, would inevitably once again bring harm to the international community and have seriously negative impacts on international peace, security and stability". On 6 May, the Ministry of Foreign Affairs Lin Jian condemned Japan's "offensive missile" test at the Balikatan 2026 joint drill held by the Philippines and the United States, stating that "The former aggressor has not only failed to deeply reflect on its historical crimes but has instead dispatched military forces overseas and launched offensive missiles under the guise of so-called ‘security cooperation’". In August 2026, Chinese Ambassador to Russia Zhang Hanhui published an article in TASS where raised concerns over Japan’s large plutonium stockpile, saying it could be used to develop nuclear weapons if Japan changed its policy. Japan rejected the concerns and reiterated its Three Non-Nuclear Principles and its commitment to using nuclear energy for peaceful purposes.

==== State media ====
Chinese state media criticized Takaichi's remarks intensively. Starting on 12 November, the China Media Group's Yuyuan Tantian published two commentaries on its Chinese social media account where it criticized Sanae Takaichi's remarks with insults. On the same day, Hu Xijin, former editor-in-chief of the CCP-owned tabloid Global Times, called Takaichi, on X, an evil witch who had ignited a new round of mutual hatred between the Chinese and Japanese people, though he later said on 25 November that state media used harsh language that does not reflect the actual situation when criticizing Takaichi and Japan and warned against "exaggerated" and "superficial" information. On 14 November, the People's Daily published an editorial under the pseudonym "Zhong Sheng", used to represent the CCP's official view on foreign policy issues, which called Takaichi's statement "utterly isolating political nonsense" and said its aim was "breaking through the restraints of the peaceful constitution" and "seeking a pretext for Japanese military expansion". On 15 November, Beijing Daily compared Takaichi's comments to those which the Japanese Empire gave to justify its invasion of Manchuria.

On 16 November, the People's Liberation Army Daily published an article which said that if Japan intervened in a war between China and Taiwan, then its government would be "tying its nation to a chariot of self-destruction". Through an account that it operated on Chinese social media, the daily had on 13 November released posters in both Chinese and Japanese which compared Japan's intervention in Taiwan Strait affairs to Japan's invasion of China in World War II. On 17 November, the People's Daily published another editorial under "Zhong Sheng", warning that "Japan risks universal condemnation if it insists on tying itself to the cart of breaking up China, [and] it will inevitably suffer the results of its own evil actions". On 18 November, Xinhua News Agency published an article saying Takaichi's statements were summoning militarist demons. The Global Times published an editorial on 19 November which questioned Japanese sovereignty over Okinawa. On 22 November, the People's Daily published an editorial which accused Takaichi of propagating the 'China threat theory' and described her words and actions as warmongering that would eventually lead Japan to its demise.

On 12 December, PLA Daily published an article by Xu Yizhen, which said Takaichi had "openly turned back the wheel of history" and that "any appeasement or tolerance of these provocative moves by Japanese right-wing politicians will only allow the ghost of militarism to rise again and once more place the peoples of Asia in peril". On 15 December, a People's Daily "Zhong Sheng" editorial said Takaichi was "launching a serious provocation" on Taiwan, saying "Japan has never truly reflected on its historical crimes, and right-wing forces have never ceased attempting to rewrite history. Today, there is even a risk of militarism rising from the ashes". On 18 December, the PLA Daily published two articles criticizing Japan's "militarization of space". On 22 December, it published an article attacking Japan for having "no respect for history", saying that "instead, there is only a malicious attempt to cover up war crimes by using selective stories and wordplay, aiming to completely rewrite the facts of the invasion as generations pass". On 25 December, the People's Daily published an editorial which said that "Post-war Japan has failed to carry out a thorough reckoning with militarism... This ‘neo-militarism’, cloaked in the guise of a ‘peaceful nation’, is gradually becoming a real danger to Asia and the world at large".

On 2 January 2026, the Study Times published an editorial stating Japanese militarism was infiltrating culture and sports. On 8 January, the China Arms Control and Disarmament Association and the China Institute of Nuclear Industry Strategy jointly released a 29-page report titled Nuclear Ambitions of Japan’s Right-Wing Forces: A Serious Threat to World Peace, which said recent actions by Japanese "right wing forces" were causing a "serious threat" to world peace and alleged Japan was seeking nuclear weapons. The report also claimed that statements from Japanese officials on acquisition of nuclear weapons were "not isolated or personal views". On 6 January, after China imposed trade restrictions on Japan, Yuyuan Tantian, a social media account operated by China Central Television, characterized Japan's defence procurement system—in which the Ministry of Defense contracts production to private-sector firms—as a deliberate attempt to obscure military activities within its civilian industrial base, and stated China was "now moving to cut off this support at its root", adding that China's focus has moved beyond any single statement by Japanese government to the "systemic and fundamental issues" in the country. On 24 March, Hua Dan and Zhang Li of the PLA Army Engineering University wrote an article at the PLA Daily, stating Japan's deployment of Type-12 missiles means it "is transitioning from a primarily defensive weapon to a long-range system capable of striking targets in neighbouring countries". On the same day, an editorial by Zhong Sheng at the People's Daily criticizing Takaichi's economic policies, stating "The Takaichi administration’s obsession with militaristic adventurism is by no means a cure for the Japanese economy, but a poison that will accelerate its decay", stating Japan was "under the dual squeeze" of an "oil premium" and weakening yen, and accused of Takaichi of avoiding structural reforms in favor of defense, which it said "essentially ties Japan’s economy ever more tightly to the chariot of ‘new militarism’, with the ultimate cost borne by the Japanese people".

=== Japan ===
==== Government ====
On 10 November, Japanese chief cabinet secretary Minoru Kihara, foreign minister Toshimitsu Motegi, and Takayuki Kobayashi, chairman of the Policy Research Council of the Liberal Democratic Party (LDP), all stated that Xue Jian's remarks were inappropriate. On 11 November, the LDP held a joint meeting of its Foreign Affairs Committee and the Foreign Affairs Research Committee, where the participants agreed to require the government to expel Xue Jian as a persona non grata. On 13 November, former prime minister Shigeru Ishiba said that Takaichi's remarks were not conducive to enhancing Japan's deterrence capabilities and that successive Japanese cabinets avoided directly responding to questions regarding situations involving Taiwan. On 15 November, in response to China's travel advisory against Japan, Kihara asked China to take appropriate actions and said communication between the two countries was essential. On the same day, the three parties in the Osaka City Council, namely the LDP, Komeito, and Osaka Restoration Association, proposed a resolution demanding that Xue Jian apologize, which passed without objection.

On 16 November, LDP acting policy research committee chairman Norihisa Tamura stated Takaichi had not provided sufficient background information during her remarks and that she should not make such statements in the future. Tamura also criticized Xue Jian's remarks, believing that they encouraged terrorism. On 18 November, in response to questions about China's travel advisory against Japan, Kimi Onoda, Japan's economic security minister, said the country needed to see the dangers of economic dependence on China given its willingness to use economic coercion in order to settle disputes. On the same day, Hirofumi Yoshimura, leader of the Japan Innovation Party, condemned Xue Jian's remarks, saying that "a red line has been crossed". He also said that preparations should be made to reduce the economic risks brought about by the decrease in Chinese tourists. On 19 November, The Asahi Shimbun reported that Takaichi privately told people around her that she "went a bit too far" and "gave an answer without fully checking what the fallout would be".

The Japan External Trade Organization (JETRO) stated that as of 20 November, more than 20 Sino-Japanese business-related events had been cancelled. On 21 November, when asked whether she would retract her comments, Takaichi refused, saying Japan's stance remained consistent and that her government would decide whether an event reached a survival-threatening threshold when the time came. On 22 November, Transport Minister Yasushi Kaneko said the decline in tourism numbers from China was not something to worry about given the increase in arrivals from other countries. On 25 November, in response to a question about Trump's public silence on Japan's dispute with China, Motegi said it has never been the case that the White House or the State Department has commented on every issue that could affect it. On 26 November, Takaichi told the parliament regarding her comments that she "did not want to go into specifics", but "simply repeated the government’s previous answers over and over, there was a risk that the Budget Committee could be stalled". She also said Japan was "not in a position to recognize Taiwan's legal status". On 1 December, a cross-party delegation from the Japan–China Friendship Parliamentarians' Union led by secretary-general Yūko Obuchi of the LDP met with Chinese ambassador Wu Jianghao. The group, which included both LDP and opposition party members, expressed their hope to visit China later this year.

On 3 December, Takaichi stated to the Japanese parliament that the "Japanese government's basic position regarding Taiwan remains as stated in the 1972 Japan–China Joint Communiqué, and there has been no change to this position". The position is that "the government of the People’s Republic of China reiterates that Taiwan is an inalienable part of the territory of the People’s Republic of China" and that Japan "fully understands and respects this stand" and "firmly maintains its stand under Article 8 of the Potsdam Declaration". China refused Takaichi's explanation, with Chinese foreign ministry spokesperson Lin Jian stating Takaichi is "still prevaricating by claiming that the Japanese side’s position remains unchanged" and demanded a full retraction of Takaichi's 7 November statement. In the same day, LDP vice president Tarō Asō said Takaichi's 7 November statement was "not problematic", saying that she "simply stated her consistent stance in more detail". Several news agencies reported that Japan had expressed its concerns to France about China's possible participation in the 2026 G7 summit, where French president Emmanuel Macron was reportedly considering inviting Chinese leader Xi Jinping. On 13 December, after Chinese foreign minister Wang Yi talked with France, Germany and the United Kingdom regarding Japan, National Security Council director-general Keiichi Ichikawa contacted the three countries to state that Japan's position on Taiwan had not changed.

On 15 December, after questioning by Japanese Communist Party (JCP) lawmaker Taku Yamazoe, Japanese foreign minister Toshimitsu Motegi told the Japanese parliament that "Regarding Taiwan, Japan's fundamental policy is, as the prime minister has clearly stated, in line with the 1972 Japan–China Joint Communique", saying that the "document states that the Government of Japan fully understands and respects this stand of the Government of the People’s Republic of China, and it firmly maintains its stand under Article 8 of the Potsdam Proclamation", referencing the PRC's position that Taiwan is a part of China. After further questioning by Yamazoe, Motegi said that "Article 8 of the Potsdam Declaration incorporates the provisions of the Cairo Declaration", and said that while Japan was "not a party to the Cairo Declaration itself", the Potsdam Declaration "stipulates that its provisions must be carried out". and stated "the Cairo Declaration set out the policy objectives of the Allied Powers at the time, including the return of Manchuria, Taiwan and other territories from Japan to what was then the Republic of China. [The Potsdam Declaration] states that the terms shall be carried out", and said "Japan accepted the Potsdam Declaration". The Chinese foreign ministry spokesperson Guo Jiakun noted the statement, but also said that "the Japanese side did not reiterate the Japanese government’s recognition that the government of the People’s Republic of China is the sole legal government of China, or that Taiwan is an inalienable part of the territory of the People’s Republic of China" and "deliberately sidestepped the important information that they are 'territories Japan has stolen from the Chinese'".

On 17 December, Takaichi said in a press conference after an extraordinary Diet session that China is an "important neighbor" and that Japan wants to "continue frank dialogue and comprehensively promote a mutually beneficial relationship [with China] based on common strategic interests". On 25 December, Takaichi said that "As neighboring countries, there do tend to be areas of concern and challenges, but that is precisely why communication on all levels, including at the leadership level, is so important", adding that Japan is "open to all sorts of dialogue with China. We have not closed that door". On 18 December, an unnamed official in the prime minister's office suggested that Japan should consider acquiring nuclear weapons. This resulted in a strong reaction from China's foreign ministry, who responded that it was a "serious issue that exposes the dangerous attempts by some in Japan to breach international law and possess nuclear weapons" and regarded that as a "signal of the resurgence of Japanese militarism". The Japanese government later clarified that Japan's non-nuclear weapons policy has not changed, but did not comment on the official's subsequent status. Conservatives in Japan has expressed similar support for nuclear weapons, including the Sankei Shimbun in its editorial.

On 27 January 2026, in response to a questioning by an opposition party leader, Takaichi told a TV program that "I want to make it absolutely clear that this is not about Japan going out and taking military action if China and the United States come into conflict (over Taiwan)", continuing that "If something serious happens there, we would have to go to rescue the Japanese and American citizens in Taiwan. In that situation, there may be cases where we take joint action. And if the U.S. forces, acting jointly with us, come under attack and Japan does nothing and simply runs away, the Japan–U.S. alliance would collapse. So we would respond strictly within the limits of the law — within the limits of the laws as they currently exist — while making a comprehensive judgment based on what is happening on the ground". In March 2026, Japan dropped the phrase "one of Japan's most important bilateral relations" to describe relations with China in its draft Diplomatic Bluebook, instead describing China as an "important neighbor". On 17 June, Japanese defense minister Shinjirō Koizumi questioned the accuracy and transparency of China's official military budget figures, while stating Japan's budget "undergo scrutiny and deliberation in parliament"; the Chinese Foreign Ministry said Koizumi's claims were "inconsistent with facts" and "riddled with flaws", designed to mislead the international community. On 7 October, after Chinese foreign ministry spokesperson, Guo Jiakun referred to the prime minister as just "Sanae Takaichi", Japanese foreign ministry spokesperson Toshihiro Kitamura said "Even when there are differences in our positions, I believe that, as a matter of international protocol, it is only natural to show appropriate respect to the leader of another country".

==== Opposition parties ====
On 11 November, the Constitutional Democratic Party (CDP), Komeito and the Democratic Party For the People (DPFP) issued protests against Xue Jian's comments. CDP Secretary-General Jun Anzumi criticized them as not beneficial to bilateral relations while DPFP leader Yuichiro Tamaki said they had crossed the bottom line and hinted that Xue might be asked to leave Japan. On the same day, Renhō, a CDP councillor who was born a citizen of Taiwan, posted on X that Xue's comments damaged trust between Japan and China. On 13 November, Komeito leader Tetsuo Saito questioned Takaichi's position on a Taiwan emergency and said he would submit questions to the government to clarify its stance on the matter. On 11 November, Saito had expressed concern to the Chinese Embassy in Japan that Xue's actions were inconsistent with his status as a diplomat. On 15 November, Japanese Communist Party (JCP) policy committee member Taku Yamazoe called on Takaichi to retract her comments. On the same day, former prime minister and CDP leader Yoshihiko Noda said that Takaichi's remarks had a significant impact and needed to be taken seriously.

On 16 November, Tomofumi Honjo, the policy research chairman of the CDP, said that Sanae Takaichi did not have a sufficient understanding of the relevant security legislation or of China's stance on the Taiwan issue. He also said that he hoped Japan would proceed with calm dialogue. On 19 November, Motohisa Furukawa, acting representative of the DPFP, said that the Japanese government needed to ask China to explain its response and, if necessary, ask it to withdraw Xue's comments. On the same day, Social Democratic Party leader Mizuho Fukushima, called on Takaichi to retract her remarks, arguing they were causing economic damage to Japanese society. Conservative Party of Japan leader Naoki Hyakuta said that the statement was justified and that it does not have to be retracted. He also congratulated the fall in the number of Chinese tourists. On 23 November JCP Chair Tomoko Tamura said in an interview that Takaichi should retract her remarks on Taiwan, as otherwise relations with China would deteriorate further. On 26 November, CDP leader Yoshihiko Noda argued that Takaichi not mentioning any specific examples regarding Taiwan during the parliament meeting amounted to a "de facto retraction", an explanation which Chinese foreign ministry spokesperson Guo Jiakun refused by saying "Ceasing to mention the remarks and retracting them are two entirely different matters". JCP Central Committee chairman Kazuo Shii also said he did not believe that Takaichi had retracted her statement.

On 10 December, Komeito leader Tetsuo Saito said that he had held one in-person meeting and multiple phone calls with the Chinese ambassador Wu Jianghao since Takaichi's remarks, adding that he hoped to visit China in 2026 and would be willing to take a letter on Takaichi's behalf if requested. On 12 December, CDP lawmaker Kiyomi Tsujimoto said she obtained a script from the Cabinet Secretariat made for Takaichi in advance of her testimony to the Diet in November, which showed the planned response for any questions regarding Taiwan was for Takaichi to decline to comment on hypothetical situations such as a Taiwan crisis.

==== News media ====
On 10 November, Yomiuri Shimbun's English-language newspaper The Japan News said that Xue's comment was inappropriate and that it was natural for the Japanese government to lodge a protest against it. Follow up editorials which it published on 18 and 20 November criticized China's pressure campaign against Japan and called on Japan to continue its protests against China's actions and to make efforts to explain itself. On 14 November, The Japan Times said Xue's comments were both offensive and in bad taste and a follow up editorial on 21 November called on Japan not to bend to China's campaign of economic coercion.

On 11 November, The Mainichi said Takaichi's comments left the door open to dangerous over-interpretation and revealed a lack of awareness of the serious way that the Taiwan contingency scenario had impacted Japan-China relations. An initial follow up editorial on 18 November called for de escalation from both Japan and China while a second follow up on 21 November called for Japan to continue engaging in dialogue with China in spite of the countermeasures it had imposed on Japan which the publication described as anti-Japan in nature. On the same day, Chunichi Shimbun criticized her remarks as reckless and careless and said she should be more careful with her words in the future. An initial follow up editorial on 18 November called for the two countries to continue communicating while a second follow up on 24 November described Takaichi's remarks as a provocation to China and said the opposition parties must not hesitate to criticize her government's policies and actions.

On 15 November, The Nikkei said that although China's response to Takaichi's remarks indicated it had lost its composure, the two countries nevertheless needed to talk in order to prevent conflict escalation. A follow up editorial on 25 November said Japan-U.S. solidarity was essential to countering China's propaganda offensive against Japan. On 18 November, The Asahi Shimbun said Takaichi needlessly heightened tensions with her choice of words while also expressing doubts about the logic of China's response.

==== Public opinion ====
According to a poll published by Kyodo News after Takaichi's remarks, 48.8% of respondents supported activating collective self-defense in the event of a conflict over Taiwan, while 44.2% opposed it. The poll also showed that the latest approval rating of the Takaichi Cabinet was 69.9%, an increase of 5.5 percentage points from October. According to a Nikkei/TV Tokyo survey conducted from 28 to 30 November 55% of respondents believed Takaichi's comments were appropriate and 30% called it inappropriate. The survey also showed the approval rating of the Takaichi Cabinet was 75%. According to a Japan News Network opinion poll in December, 27% of respondents said they believed Takaichi's statement was a problem, while 55% said they did not. Additionally, 51% said they were anxious about the future of relations between China and Japan, while 46% said they were not. According to another poll by All-Nippon News Network in December, 66% of Japanese respondents said they were concerned about the deterioration of relations with China.

According to a government survey in January 2026, 68% of Japanese respondents picked advances in Chinese military technology and its activities close to Japan and in the South China Sea as their top security worry, taking over worries from North Korea's missile program. According to an NHK poll in the same month, 67% of Japanese respondents were concerned about the impact of export controls announced by China on Japan. Takaichi's stance on China, including her statements that sparked this diplomatic crisis, was cited as a factor of LDP's landslide win in the 2026 Japanese general election resulting in LDP gaining a supermajority in the Lower House. According to a poll by The Asahi Shimbun in September 2026, 57% of Japanese respondents thought that Takaichi should make efforts to improve ties with China, including 58% of LDP members. According to a Jiji Press poll from November 2026, 38.4% percent of Japanese respondents disapproved of Takaichi's China stance, 33.6% approved it, while 27.9% were unsure.

==== Chinese embassy attack ====
On 24 March 2026, a person who claimed to be an active officer of Japan Self-Defence Forces forcibly entered the Chinese embassy in Tokyo, who threatened to "kill Chinese diplomatic personnel in the name of god". The spokesman for the Chinese foreign ministry Lin Jian stated that "China is deeply shocked by this incident and has lodged a strong protest with Japan". The suspect was later arrested and identified as Kodai Murata (村田晃大), a member of the Japan Ground Self-Defense Force from Ebino Garrison in Miyazaki Prefecture. He was formally arrested for having a knife with a length of 18 centimeters when he broke into the embassy.

== International reactions ==
=== Taiwan ===
On 10 November, Presidential Office spokesperson Karen Kuo said Xue's remarks exceeded diplomatic etiquette and that the government took them seriously. On 11 November, Taiwan's Ministry of Foreign Affairs said that "Republic of China (Taiwan) is a sovereign, independent nation" and said it was not subordinate to the PRC. On 14 November, Mainland Affairs Council deputy minister Shen Yu-chung said China was ignoring international appeals for peace in the Taiwan Strait and was instead threatening countries that expressed pro-Taiwan sentiments. On 15 November, National Security Council secretary-general Joseph Wu said China chose to continue using humiliating rhetoric against Japan instead of reflecting on the insulting nature of Xue's remarks. On 16 November, former president Ma Ying-jeou, a member of the Kuomintang, accused Takaichi of "reckless adventurism", saying cross-strait relations were an "internal matter" that Japan should not intervene in. Former Kuomintang chairwoman Hung Hsiu-chu also criticized Takaichi's remarks, saying that Taiwan was "no longer Japan’s colony" and that Takaichi was "overreaching" and "reckless". In response, Democratic Progressive Party (DPP) legislator Rosalia Wu criticized the Kuomintang for "failing to distinguish between friend and foe" while Chen Kuan-ting, also a DPP legislator, accused Ma of echoing Beijing's view of the crisis.

On 17 November, Taiwanese president Lai Ching-te described China's measures against Japan as a hybrid attack that undermined regional peace and stability and called on the country to exercise restraint. Taiwanese foreign minister Lin Chia-lung said Takaichi's statements were consistent with those made by Shinzo Abe that had linked Taiwan's security directly to Japan's. On the same day, Kuomintang chairwoman Cheng Li-wun accused Lai of inflaming tensions and said leaders should instead show caution and restraint. On 18 November, in response to a question about changes in relations between Japan and China stemming from Xue's comments, Ministry of Foreign Affairs spokesperson Hsiao Kuang-wei called on China to stop taking provocative actions and that Taiwan would continue to work with like-minded countries to uphold regional stability and security. On 20 November, Lai published pictures of himself eating Japanese-sourced sushi in a show of support to Japan. On the same day, Foreign Minister Lin said more people from Taiwan should travel to Japan and buy its products as a show of support for the country. On 21 November, the Ministry of Health and Welfare announced that Taiwan would lift all import control measures on Japanese food products. Several DPP politicians including Wang Yi-chuan visited Japan as a show of support.

On 23 November, an assessment produced by the National Security Bureau said the crisis would accelerate Japan's efforts at implementing security reforms. On 25 November, Taiwanese premier Cho Jung-tai said that "reunification" with China was "not an option". On 27 November, several members of the New Party protested in front of the Japan–Taiwan Exchange Association. On 5 December, during a meeting with Japan's representative in Taiwan Shuzo Sumi, Cho said that Takaichi's statements "moved us all very, very much. They represent justice and peace" and welcomed Japanese performance groups and pop idols to Taiwan. On 22 December, LDP executive acting secretary-general Kōichi Hagiuda led a group of LDP politicians to visit Taiwan; the delegation met with President Lai. In addition, three LDP lawmakers – Keisuke Suzuki, Akihisa Nagashima and Junichi Kanda – as well as a five-person delegation led by Hirofumi Takinami visited Taiwan around the same period.

=== United States ===
On 12 November, the United States State Department issued a statement to Nikkei Asia which said the country was committed to maintaining peace and stability across the Taiwan Strait and opposed any unilateral changes to the status quo by either side. When asked during a 10 November Fox News interview whether China could not be considered a friend of the United States due to Xue's threatening comments about Takaichi, US president Donald Trump did not offer support for Takaichi, and said that "Well, a lot of our allies aren’t our friends, either. Our allies took advantage of us on trade more than China did".

Bloomberg News noted that Trump and high-ranking US government officials did not offer public support for Takaichi, while lower-level officials including US ambassador to Japan George Edward Glass spoke out on her behalf. The Global Taiwan Institute also noted that the US government has largely refrained from any public involvement. Financial Times noted the US had given little public support other than statements made by Glass. On 10 November, Glass said in a post on X that Xue's comment threatened Takaichi and the Japanese people. From 15 to 16 November, Glass posted two messages on X: the first one thanked China for helping Japan and the United States deepen their ties while the second, which contained a photo of Sanae Takaichi and Trump on the same stage at the USS George Washington, said Japan and the United States remained committed to maintaining peace and stability across the Taiwan Strait. On 20 November, after a meeting with Foreign Minister Toshimitsu Motegi, Glass called China's ban on Japanese seafood a case of economic coercion and reaffirmed the country's obligation to defend Japan, which he said included the Senkaku islands. On the same day, the State Department spokesperson Tommy Pigott said America's treaty commitment to Japan's security was unwavering and that it opposed any unilateral attempts to change the regional status quo; the Financial Times reported that the US officials had promised to give a strong statement of support for Japan but that Japanese officials were "disappointed" to learn that statement was a post by Pigott.

On 24 November, President Trump held back to back calls with Chinese leader Xi Jinping and Japanese prime minister Takaichi. Both China and the United States said Trump initiated the calls. In a post on Truth Social, Trump said he had a very good telephone call with Xi Jinping and that China–US relations were "extremely strong", adding they had discussed many topics, including the war in Ukraine, America's fentanyl crisis, and Chinese purchases of U.S. farm products; the post did not mention Japan or Taiwan. On 25 November, Trump said Xi had during their call more or less agreed to his request that China accelerate and increase purchases of American goods. Trump subsequently held a call with Takaichi to brief her on his call with Xi. According to The Wall Street Journal and Reuters, Trump advised Takaichi to not escalate tensions and not to provoke China on the question of Taiwan's sovereignty. In reference to this reporting, Japanese chief cabinet secretary Minoru Kihara said on 27 November that Trump had given no such advice. In the same day, Kyodo News also reported Trump urged Takaichi to avoid escalating tensions with China. On 14 December, Hokkaido Shimbun reported that Trump had told Takaichi that "the US and China are trying to get along, so don't get in the way" citing a government source, and that Takaichi was "quite depressed" after the meeting as Trump "didn't give Takaichi the answer she had in mind".

On 7 December, Financial Times reported that according to Japanese officials, there was "deep disappointment" in the Japanese government over the lack of public support from US top officials, adding that Japanese ambassador to the US Shigeo Yamada had urged the Trump administration for public support. On 11 December, White House spokesperson Karoline Leavitt said that Trump believes the US "should be in a position to have a good working relationship with China while maintaining our very strong alliance with Japan". On 19 December, US Secretary of State Marco Rubio called tensions between China and Japan "preexisting", and said that he believes that "we feel very strongly that we can continue with our strong, firm partnership and alliance with Japan, and do so in a way that continues to allow us to find productive ways to work together with the Chinese Communist Party and the Chinese government".

In March 2026, the US Intelligence Community released the Annual Threat Assessment report, which devoted a large section covering Sino-Japanese relations. It wrote that Takaichi's "specific comments carry weight in Japan’s system because the phrase ‘survival threatening situation’ serves as a possible legal justification for military authorities" and that they "represent a significant shift for a sitting Japanese prime minister". In response, Chief Cabinet Secretary Minoru Kihara said that the "claim that there has been a significant shift in policy is inaccurate". In May 2026, the Financial Times reported that, at a meeting with Trump during his visit to China, Xi Jinping had condemned Prime Minister Takaichi for Japan's "remilitarisation", with Xi reportedly becoming "vocal and agitated when discussing Japan". Adding that this was the most intense part of Trump's visit, the Financial Times reported Trump had responded by saying Japan had to take a more assertive defense stance due to rising threats from North Korea. Following Xi's state visit to the United States in September 2026, The Yomiuri Shimbun later quoted government officials as saying that during his state visit, Xi criticized Prime Minister Sanae Takaichi and her cabinet for supporting "neo-militarism". Trump in turn called her a “strong leader” and recommended that China engage in negotiations with her. The New York Times later reported in November 2026 that Xi told Trump that Japan's military buildup was threatening to destabilize East Asia and told to be cautious regarding working with Takaichi, who he called "militarist".

=== Other countries ===
- Australia: On 7 December 2025, following Chinese jets locking their fire-control radar at Japanese jets, Australian defence minister Richard Marles stated that Australia was "deeply concerned" by China's actions and pledged to work with Japan in upholding a rules-based order, though he did not address the spat over Takaichi's statements.
- Cambodia: On 27 November 2025, in reaction to the diplomatic crisis, the Cambodian Ministry of Foreign Affairs and International Cooperation released a statement saying "Cambodia strongly advocates for efforts to maintain regional peace, stability and harmony, based on the principle of mutual respect and peaceful resolution of differences and disputes". It said that Cambodia "resolutely adheres to the One-China Policy" and recognizes Taiwan as an "inalienable part of China’s territory", describing matters related to Taiwan as China's internal matters, and said Cambodia supports China's "efforts toward national reunification" and opposes Taiwan independence.
- Laos: On 28 November 2025, the Lao Foreign Ministry stated that Laos firmly supports UN General Assembly Resolution 2758, adheres to the one-China principle, recognizes that Taiwan is an inseparable part of the territory of the People's Republic of China, and opposes any interference in China's internal affairs.
- Myanmar: On 22 November 2025, Myanmar military junta's Deputy Minister of Information Zaw Min Tun told Xinhua News Agency Takaichi's remarks showed "no lessons learned from history" and "no remorse" for Japan's wartime crimes across Asia, including Myanmar. He said that "Myanmar firmly condemns any possible resurgence of fascist tendencies in Japan", accusing Japan of supporting Taiwan independence, and reaffirmed Myanmar's support for the one China policy. The Irrawaddy noted that since the junta seized power in 2021 in a coup d'état, it had relied heavily on China for support while Japan had downgraded its diplomatic ties it and instead maintained contacts with Myanmar's pro-democracy forces.
- North Korea: On 12 November 2025, the North Korean Ministry of Foreign Affairs issued a statement stating Japan has "kept provoking China", accusing the country of "using the Taiwan issue as a leverage for taking sides with the U.S. in the implementation of "Indo-Pacific Strategy", a tool for attaining its own politico-diplomatic goals", which it said would "only cause security concerns in the region and discord between nations". On 18 November, during an annual UN debate, North Korea said that the "international community still remembers Japan's unprecedented, heinous anti-humanity crimes in history". Starting from 11 January 2026, North Korea started to accuse Japan of "neo-militarism", adopting a similar wording from China.
- Pakistan: On 28 November 2025, in response to a question by the Xinhua News Agency regarding Takaichi's comments, Pakistan Foreign Ministry spokesperson Tahir Andrabi said that Pakistan was firmly supportive of the one China policy, unequivocally recognizing the People's Republic of China as the sole legitimate government representing all of China and Taiwan an inalienable part of China, and said Pakistan opposes any attempt to create two Chinas, or one China, one Taiwan.
- Russia: On 18 November 2025, Foreign Ministry spokeswoman Maria Zakharova said in an interview with Xinhua News Agency in Moscow that Takaichi's remarks were "extremely dangerous" and that Japan should "deeply reflect on its history and learn from the lessons of World War II to avoid serious consequences caused by wrong words and deeds". On 20 November, Zakharova said that "Not only does Japan fail to reflect on the mistakes of its recent remarks, but it also refuses to acknowledge the results of World War II even 80 years later". After a meeting between Chinese Foreign Minister Wang Yi and Russian Security Council Secretary Sergei Shoigu on 3 December, the two countries released a joint statement saying that they had "conducted strategic alignment on issues related to Japan, reaching a high degree of consensus" and "agreed to resolutely uphold the outcomes of World War II victory, firmly oppose any attempts to whitewash colonial aggression and resolutely counter any attempts to revive fascism or Japanese militarism". Shoigu added that "the hydra of militarism is once again raising its head" but that China and Russia "will not allow the revival of criminal regimes in Europe and Tokyo". On 28 December, Russian Foreign Minister Sergey Lavrov gave an interview to TASS, where he said Russia opposes Taiwan independence and considers Taiwan to be an inseparable part of China, while urging Japan to "think carefully" before entering a "course towards militarization". On 21 May 2026, Chinese leader Xi Jinping and Russian president Vladimir Putin released a joint statement during Putin's state visit to China, which stated "Japan’s current acceleration of ‘remilitarization’ poses a serious threat to regional peace and stability" and that Japan should "resist ‘new militarism’ and ‘remilitarization’". In October 2026, Putin said Russia wanted good relations with Japan but "We are concerned by Japan’s plans for militarization".
- Singapore: On 19 November 2025, Prime Minister Lawrence Wong stated that he hoped China and Japan would "find ways to resolve these very complex issues and move forward", saying that "Southeast Asia has done that with Japan... We've put history aside and we’re moving forward". He declined to comment on Takaichi's remarks, but said a war over Taiwan was unlikely.
- South Korea: On 3 December 2025, President Lee Jae Myung said that South Korea would not take sides between China and Japan, which he said "would only escalate the conflict", and called on both countries to "seek ways to coexist". He also offered for South Korea to "play a role in mediating and coordination" between the two countries. On 5 December, South Korean ambassador to Japan Lee Hyuk said that if South Korea maintained good relations with both China and Japan, it could act as a mediator between the two countries. On 7 January, during a visit to China, President Lee stated that South Korea was "keeping an eye on the situation", adding that "If you intervene in a reasonable quarrel between adults, you will probably end up resented by both sides". He also called China's dual-export restrictions on Japan "complicated and deep-rooted", while saying he hoped the issue would be "resolved". Lee also said that for South Korea, "relations with Japan are just as important as relations with China". After China's dual-export restrictions, the Ministry of Trade, Industry and Resources announced South Korea would "preemptively review whether it is possible to replace imported Japanese items subject to China’s export curbs on dual-use goods in order to minimize negative impacts on supply chains".
- United Kingdom: On 27 November, the Secretary of State for the Indo-Pacific Seema Malhotra stated that she was "not in a position to comment on other countries' diplomacy" but added that she "hopes that any disputes over the Taiwan Strait will be resolved through dialogue".
- Vietnam: On 27 November, Vietnamese Foreign Ministry spokesperson Phạm Thu Hằng said that "Based on the "One China" policy stance, Vietnam believes that peace, stability, and cooperation in the Taiwan Strait are of significance to the region and the world".

== See also ==
- China–Japan relations
- Japan–Taiwan relations
- Political status of Taiwan
- United States Forces Japan
- Controversies surrounding Yasukuni Shrine
