= Embassy of China, Tokyo =

Embassy of the People's Republic of China in Japan 中华人民共和国驻日本大使馆 (Chinese) 駐日中華人民共和国大使館 (Japanese)
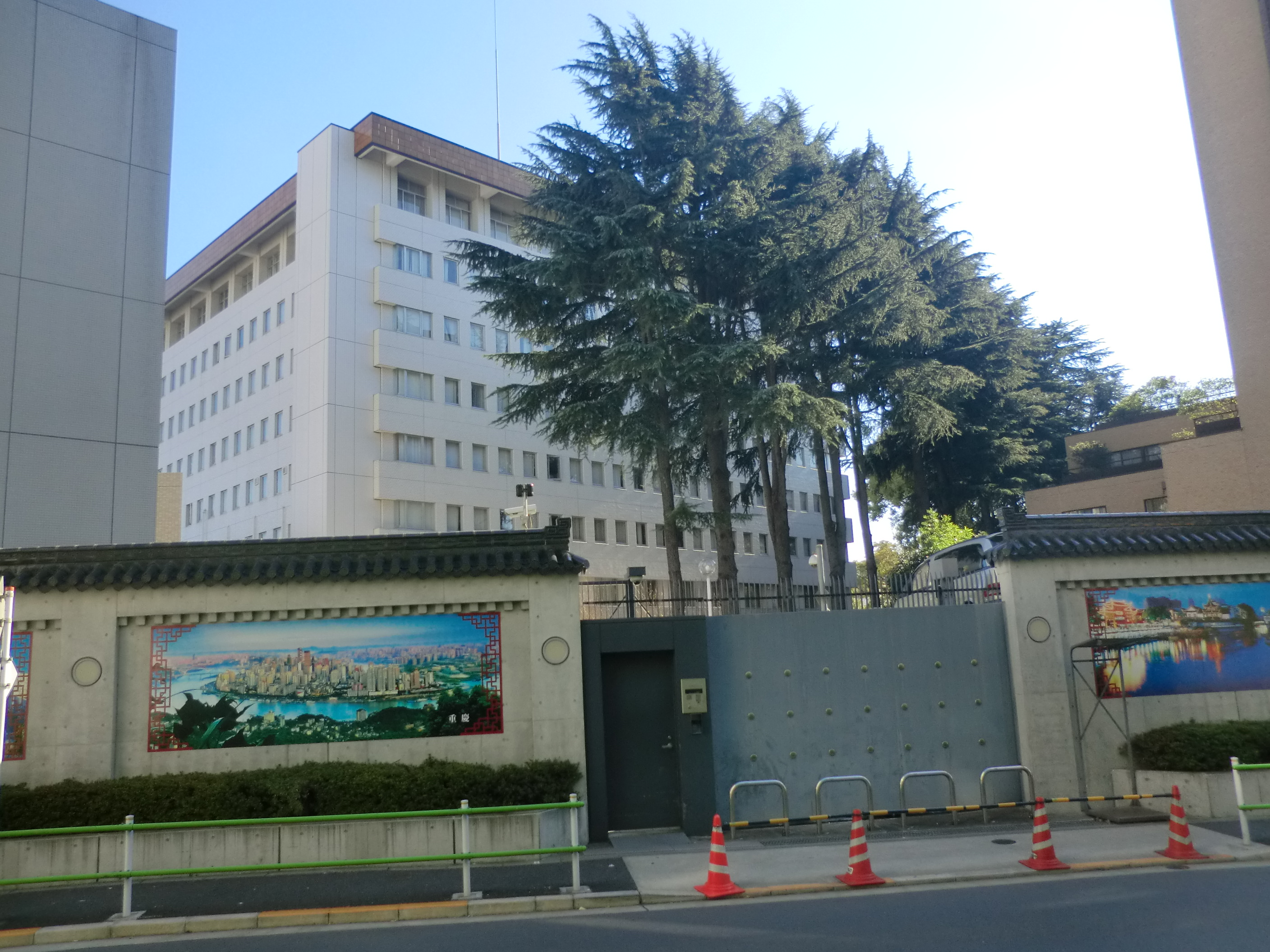
- Location: Moto-Azabu, Minato, Tokyo, Japan
- Coordinates: 35°39′23″N 139°43′48″E
- Ambassador: Wu Jianghao
- Website: jp.china-embassy.gov.cn/chn/

The Embassy of the People's Republic of China in Japan (Chinese: 中华人民共和国驻日本大使馆; Japanese: 駐日中華人民共和国大使館) is the official diplomatic mission of the People's Republic of China to Japan. The current ambassador is Wu Jianghao.

== History ==
China-Japan Memorandum of Understanding Trade Office Liaison Office in Tokyo is the unofficial diplomatic office of China in Tokyo before normalization. This office was established in August 1964.

The agency was originally named "Liao Chengzhi Liaison Office in Tokyo". From April 14 to 18, 1964, Liao Chengzhi's office and Tatsunosuke Takasaki's office held talks on the mutual dispatch of representatives and the establishment of liaison offices. The two sides reached an agreement on mutually sending representatives and setting up liaison offices. The two parties have successfully established liaison offices in each other's country, with the "Liaison Office of Liao Chengzhi Office in Tokyo" under China's Foreign Affairs Office, and the "Liaison Office of Takasaki Office in Beijing" under Japan's Ministry of International Trade and Industry.

In February 1968, when the two sides were negotiating on an annual agreement, both agreed to a renaming of the offices to a "memorandum of trading offices" in each country. On November 27, 1972, the closing ceremony of the memorandum of understanding was held at the Beijing Hotel. On December 31, 1972, the liaison office in Beijing was officially closed. One member of the office was transferred to the Japanese Embassy in China, another was transferred to the Liaison Office of the Japan-China Trade Association in Beijing, with the rest returning to Japan. On January 21, 1974, the liaison office in Tokyo also closed, where the organization merged into the Commercial Office of the Chinese Embassy in Japan.

On September 29, 1972, Chinese Premier Zhou Enlai and Japanese Prime Minister Kakuei Tanaka signed a joint statement formulated by the two governments in Beijing, which officially formalized the normalization of diplomatic relations between the two countries. Soon after, the two respective embassies opened. On February 1, 1973, the embassy officially opened while the building was still being built, and so the diplomatic office was temporarily located in the Hotel New Otani Tokyo. After the building was completed, the embassy moved to the building in Moto-Azabu.

=== U.S. democracy tweet incident ===
As part of his 2021 State of the Union address, US President Joe Biden emphasized the superiority of democracy and called the Chinese President an authoritarian. A day after the event, the embassy posted a Tweet with an image that featured a grim reaper dressed in imitation of the American flag holding a bloody scythe with a Jewish Star of David in the middle and a caption that read "If the United States brings 'democracy', that's how it will be." The tweet triggered criticism from Japanese users and was deleted after the embassy received complaints from Israeli officials.

=== Intrusion incident ===
On 24 March 2026, a person who claimed to be an active officer of Japan Self-Defence Forces forcibly entered the Chinese embassy in Tokyo, who threatened to "kill Chinese diplomatic personnel in the name of god". The spokesman for the Chinese foreign ministry Lin Jian stated that "China is deeply shocked by this incident and has lodged a strong protest with Japan".

The suspect was later arrested and identified as Kodai Murata (Japanese: 村田晃大), a member of the Japan Ground Self-Defense Force from Ebino Garrison in Miyazaki Prefecture. He was formally arrested for having a knife with a length of 18 centimeters when he broke into the embassy.

== List of Ambassadors ==
| Name (English) | Name (Chinese) | Tenure begins | Tenure ends | Note |
|---|---|---|---|---|
| Chen Chu | 陈楚 | April 1973 | December 1976 | |
| Fu Hao | 符浩 | August 1977 | February 1982 | |
| Song Zhiguang | 宋之光 | March 1982 | August 1985 | |
| Zhang Shu | 章曙 | September 1985 | June 1988 | |
| Yang Zhenya | 杨振亚 | January 1988 | March 1993 | |
| Xu Dunxin | 徐敦信 | December 1992 | June 1998 | |
| Chen Jian | 陈健 | April 1998 | July 2001 | |
| Wu Dawei | 武大伟 | July 2001 | August 2004 | |
| Wang Yi | 王毅 | September 2004 | September 2007 | |
| Cui Tiankai | 崔天凯 | September 2007 | January 2010 | |
| Cheng Yonghua | 程永华 | February 2010 | May 2019 | |
| Kong Xuanyou | 孔铉佑 | May 2019 | February 2023 | |
| Wu Jianghao | 吴江浩 | February 2023 | | |

== See also ==
- China-Japan Relations
- Embassy of Japan, Beijing
- Japan-China Joint Communique
