= Liu Jinsong =

Chinese diplomat

- 刘劲松

Chinese Ambassador to Australia
- Incumbent
- Assumed office 24 August 2026
- Appointed by: Xi Jinping
- Preceded by: Xiao Qian

Director-General of the Department of Asian Affairs
- In office July 2021 – July 2026
- Preceded by: Wu Jianghao
- Succeeded by: Shen Minjuan

Director-General of the Department of Policy Planning
- In office August 2019 – July 2021
- Preceded by: Sun Weidong
- Succeeded by: Miao Deyu

Chinese Ambassador to Afghanistan
- In office January 2018 – July 2019
- Preceded by: Yao Jing
- Succeeded by: Wang Yu

Personal details
- Born: February 1972 (age 54) Zhejiang, China
- Party: Chinese Communist Party
- Education: Renmin University of China; Tufts University

Liu Jinsong (Chinese: 刘劲松, romanized: Liú Jìnsōng, born February 1972) is a Chinese diplomat, serving as Chinese Ambassador to Australia since 2026.

== Career ==
Born in February 1972 in Zhejiang and raised in Xinjiang, Liu graduated from the Institute of Regional Economics at Renmin University of China and the Fletcher School of Diplomacy at Tufts University. In 1993, he joined the Ministry of Foreign Affairs and worked in the Department of Asian Affairs, the Policy Research Office, and the Chinese Embassy in Thailand. In 2004, he became First Secretary at the Embassy in Japan and was later promoted to Political Counselor. In 2007, he became Political Counselor at the Embassy in the United Kingdom. In 2010, he became Deputy Director of the Research Bureau of the Taiwan Affairs Office.

In 2011, Liu became Deputy Director of the Department of Hong Kong, Macao and Taiwan Affairs of the Ministry of Foreign Affairs. In 2012, he became Deputy Director of the Department of Policy Planning of the Ministry of Foreign Affairs. In the same year, he became Deputy Director of the Department of International Economic Affairs of the Ministry of Foreign Affairs and Director of the Silk Road Fund. In 2015, he became Minister and Chief Mission Officer at the Embassy in India. In January 2018, he became the Chinese ambassador to Afghanistan. In July 2019, he left his post as ambassador to Afghanistan and became Director of the Department of Policy Planning of the Ministry of Foreign Affairs. In July 2021, he was reassigned as Director-General of the Department of Asian Affairs of the Ministry of Foreign Affairs.

In November 2025, amidst a diplomatic crisis between China and Japan, Liu met with Masaaki Kanai, director-general of the Japanese Foreign Ministry's Asian and Oceanian Affairs Bureau, to defuse tensions following comments made by Japanese Prime Minister Sanae Takaichi. Liu said that the meeting's atmosphere was "serious", and that he was "of course not satisfied" with its result. After the meeting, the Chinese side took the unusual step of allowing reporters into the Ministry of Foreign Affairs building to take pictures. The two diplomats were pictured walking out of the meeting room with serious expressions. Chinese media published pictures of Liu, who was wearing a Mao suit in the style of the May Fourth Movement and had the national emblem pinned to his chest, speaking, while Kanai listened with his head down.

On 24 August 2026, Liu was appointed as Chinese Ambassador to Australia.
