= List of ambassadors of China to Japan =

The ambassador of China to Japan is the official representative of the People's Republic of China to Japan.

During the Qing dynasty, the Chinese envoy held the rank of resident minister. When the Qing dynasty fell in 1912, the Republic of China (1912–1949) was the officially recognized government of China, which upgraded the role to Ambassador in 1936.

When the Kuomintang government fell following the Chinese Civil War, Japan, along with the rest of the world continued to recognize the KMT government in exile as the legitimate government of China until the United Nations passed Resolution 2758 in 1972, recognizing the People's Republic of China as the de jure government of the region.

Due to the current political status of Taiwan, consular services with Taiwan are currently administered through the Taipei Economic and Cultural Representative Office in Japan.

== List of representatives ==
=== Resident Minister of the Qing dynasty ===
- Ho Ju-Chang, 1876–1877
- Hsu Ching-cheng (許景澄), 1880–1881
- Li Shu-Chang, 1881–1884
- Hsu Cheng-Tsu, 1884–1887
- Li Shu-Chang, 1887–1890
- Li Ching-Fang (李經方), 1890–1892
- Wang Feng-Tsao, 1892–1894
- Yu Keng, 1895–1898
- Li Cheng-To, 1898–1901
- Tsai Tiao, 1901–1903
- Yang Shu, 1903–1907
- Li Chia-Chu, 1907–1908
- Hu Wei-Te (胡惟德), 1908–1910
- Wang Ta-Hsieh (汪大燮). 1910–1913

=== Resident Minister of the Republic of China (1912–1949) ===
- Ma Ting-Liang, 1913 (chargé d'affaires)
- Lu Tsung-Yu, 1913–1916
- Chang Tsung-Hsiang, 1916-1919 (charge d'affairs)
- Chuang Ching-Ko, 1919–1920
- Hu Wei-Te (胡惟德), 1920–1922
- Ma Ting-Liang, 1922 (charge d'affairs)

=== Ambassador of the Republic of China (1912–1949) ===
Name (English)	Name (Chinese)	Tenure begins	Tenure ends	Note
Hsu Shih-Ying	許世英	1936	1938	
Chu Minyi	褚民誼	1940	1941	
Hsu Liang	徐良	1941	1943	
Tsai Pei	蔡培	1943	1945	

=== Ambassador of Taiwan (until 1972) ===
Name (English)	Name (Chinese)	Tenure begins	Tenure ends	Note
Hollington Tong	董顯光	1952	1956	
Shen Jinding	沈觐鼎	1956	1959	
Chang Li-sheng	張厲生	1959	1963	
Wei Tao-ming	魏道明	1959	1963	
Cheng Zhimai	陳之邁	1966	1969	
Peng Mengji	彭孟緝	1969	1972	

=== Ambassador of the People's Republic of China ===
Name (English)	Name (Chinese)	Tenure begins	Tenure ends	Note
Chen Chu	陈楚	April 1973	December 1976	
Fu Hao	符浩	August 1977	February 1982	
Song Zhiguang	宋之光	March 1982	August 1985	
Zhang Shu	章曙	September 1985	June 1988	
Yang Zhenya	杨振亚	January 1988	March 1993	
Xu Dunxin	徐敦信	December 1992	June 1998	
Chen Jian	陈健	April 1998	July 2001	
Wu Dawei	武大伟	July 2001	August 2004	
Wang Yi	王毅	September 2004	September 2007	
Cui Tiankai	崔天凯	September 2007	January 2010	
Cheng Yonghua	程永华	February 2010	May 2019	
Kong Xuanyou	孔铉佑	May 2019	February 2023	
Wu Jianghao	吴江浩	February 2023		

== See also ==
- China–Japan relations
