= Xue Jian =

Chinese diplomat (born 1968)

- 薛剑

Consul-General of China in Osaka
- Incumbent
- Assumed office November 2021
- Preceded by: He Zhenliang

Personal details
- Born: July 1968 (age 58) Lianshui, Jiangsu, China
- Party: Chinese Communist Party
- Education: Beijing Foreign Studies University (B.A.)

Xue Jian (Chinese: 薛剑, romanized: Xuē Jiàn; born July 1968) is a Chinese diplomat, currently serving as consul general in Osaka, Japan.

Xue was born in Lianshui County. He has held several diplomatic positions after graduating from the Beijing Foreign Studies University. Due to his provocative comments on Twitter, Xue has been described as one of China's "wolf warrior" diplomats. He was also listed as one of the diplomats amplifying Russian propaganda narratives in the 2022 Russian invasion of Ukraine. Xue also instigated the 2025 China-Japan diplomatic crisis after issuing a threatening response against a comment by Sanae Takaichi.

== Early life and career ==
Xue was born in 1968 in Lianshui County in Huai'an, Jiangsu. He studied at the Department of Japanese at Beijing Foreign Studies University. According to NEWS Post Seven, Xue participated in the 1989 Tiananmen Square protests.

After graduating from the university, Xue joined the Ministry of Foreign Affairs of China in 1992. Over the years, he held a series of important diplomatic positions, serving in the Department of Asian Affairs and the Chinese Embassy in Japan. In 2006, he was appointed First Secretary at the Chinese Embassy in Japan and was later promoted to Counsellor. He subsequently served as Counsellor and Division Director in the Department of Asian Affairs within the ministry in 2012, and as Minister-Counsellor at the Chinese Embassy in Japan in 2014. In 2018, he returned to the Department of Asian Affairs as Counsellor and was promoted to Deputy Director-General of the department in 2019.

== Consul General in Osaka ==
In November 2021, he was appointed Consul General of China in Osaka. During his tenure in Osaka, Xue has been a prolific user of Twitter, where he had more than 110,000 followers as of November 2025. Due to his provocative comments on Twitter, Xue has described as one of China's "wolf warrior" diplomats, including by a 2022 US Department of State report on diplomats amplifying Russian propaganda narratives in the 2022 Russian invasion of Ukraine. According to NEWS Post Seven, Xue had a better and more "flexible" reputation in person than on social media. It also reported that Xue once made more liberal statements in private, but became more hawkish in his 40s.

In June 2023, Xue referred to transgender people as "deformed".

=== 2024 endorsement of Reiwa Shinsengumi party ===
On 25 October 2024, ahead of the 2024 Japanese general elections, Xue endorsed the left-wing party Reiwa Shinsengumi, posting a social media clip featuring the party's leader Taro Yamamoto. On 11 November, Independent National Diet member and former chairman of the National Public Safety Commission Jin Matsubara submitted an official question asking for a response to the claim that Xue's post was a violation of the Vienna Convention on Diplomatic Relations.

=== 2025 China–Japan diplomatic crisis ===
薛剑XueJian
(@xuejianosaka)
tweeted:

Japanese:

勝手に突っ込んできたその汚い首は一瞬の躊躇もなく斬ってやるしかない。覚悟が出来ているのか。😡

Translation:

We have no choice but to chop off that stinky head that has lunged at us without a moment's hesitation. Are you ready? 😡

7 November 2025

In November 2025, Japanese Prime Minister Sanae Takaichi made comments about Japanese involvement in a war over Taiwan. Sharing a news article about her comments on the social media platform X, Xue stated, "the dirty neck that sticks itself in must be cut off." The Japanese Foreign Ministry condemned the remarks, with Chief Cabinet Secretary Minoru Kihara calling the post “extremely inappropriate”. Xue deleted the post. The Chinese Ministry of Foreign Affairs described Xue's post as a personal post “directed at the erroneous and dangerous remarks that attempt to separate Taiwan from China’s territory and advocate military intervention in the Taiwan Strait.”

At a reception held on 24 September 2026 for China's National Day, Xue said "Japan has become the world champion of anti-China and anti-China sentiment", adding relations between the two nations are "facing an unprecedentedly difficult phase" since the normalization of relations in 1972. He said the reason for strained relations was "the deeply rooted prejudice and contempt for China that has remained in Japanese society since the Meiji Restoration", arguing that China is a partner, not a threat.
