= Kong Xuanyou =

Chinese diplomat

- 孔铉佑
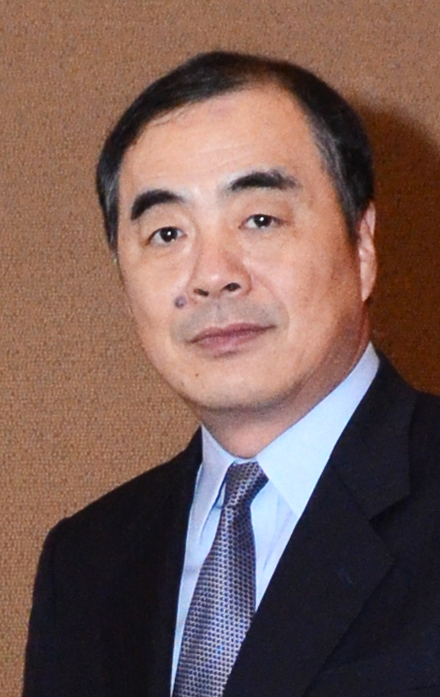
- Kong in April 2019

Chinese Ambassador to Japan
- In office 30 May 2019 – 28 February 2023
- Preceded by: Cheng Yonghua
- Succeeded by: Wu Jianghao

Vice Minister of Foreign Affairs
- In office January 2018 – May 2019
- Minister: Wang Yi

Assistant Minister of Foreign Affairs
- In office December 2015 – January 2018
- Minister: Wang Yi

Director of Department of Asian Affairs
- In office May 2014 – December 2015
- Preceded by: Luo Zhaohui
- Succeeded by: Xiao Qian

Chinese Ambassador to Vietnam
- In office August 2011 – May 2014
- Preceded by: Sun Guoxiang
- Succeeded by: Hong Xiaoyong

Personal details
- Born: July 1959 (age 67) Heilongjiang, China
- Party: Chinese Communist Party
- Education: Shanghai International Studies University; China Foreign Affairs University

Chinese name
- Traditional Chinese: 孔鉉佑
- Simplified Chinese: 孔铉佑
Transcriptions
Standard Mandarin
- Hanyu Pinyin: Kǒng Xuànyòu

Chinese Korean name
- Chosŏn'gŭl: 공현우
- Hancha: 孔鉉佑
Transcriptions
- Revised Romanization: Gong Hyeonu
- McCune–Reischauer: Kong Hyŏnu

Kong Xuanyou or Gong Hyeon-U (Chinese: 孔铉佑; Korean: 공현우; born July 1959) is a Chinese diplomat. He was the Chinese Ambassador to Japan from 2019 to 2023, and previously served as the Deputy Minister of Foreign Affairs from 2018 to 2019.

== Biography ==
Kong was born to an ethnic Korean family in Heilongjiang province in 1959. Between 1979 and 1983, he studied Arabic and Japanese languages at Shanghai International Studies University. Between 1983 and 1985 he studied foreign relations at China Foreign Affairs University.

His first diplomatic post was in the Chinese consulate of Osaka as a clerk (1985–1989). In 2006, he was appointed the envoy of the embassy of China in Japan. Between 2011 and 2014, he was the ambassador of China in Vietnam. After working briefly as the deputy of Asian affairs, he was appointed the assistant minister of the ministry of foreign affairs in 2015. In August 2017, Gong succeeded Wu Dawei as the chief representative of China in Six-party talks. He assumed the Deputy Minister of Foreign Affairs position in January 2018 until he was appointed as Ambassador to Japan.

According to South Korean media JoongAng Ilbo, when meeting with delegations of Korean parliamentarians, Kong expressed his regret on Korea's decision of deploying the Terminal High Altitude Area Defense (THAAD), but did not wish for Sino-Korean relations to worsen because of that.

== Personal life ==
Kong is married and has one daughter. Kong is said to be close friends with the former Chinese Ambassador to the United States Cui Tiankai and former Minister of Foreign Affairs Wang Yi, as they worked together in Japan.

== Awards and honors ==
- Pakistan:
  - Hilal-i-Quaid-i-Azam (2019)
- Vietnam:
  - Friendship Order (2014)
  - “For Peace and Friendship of Nations” insignia of the Vietnam Union of Friendship Association (2014)

Diplomatic posts
Preceded by Sun Guoxiang (孙国祥)	Chinese Ambassador to Vietnam; 2011–2014	Succeeded by Hong Xiaoyong
Preceded by Luo Zhaohui (罗照辉)	Director of Department of Asian Affairs; 2014–2015	Succeeded by Xiao Qian
Preceded by Cheng Yonghua	Chinese Ambassador to Japan; 2019–2023	Succeeded by Wu Jianghao
