= Beijing–Tokyo Summit =

The Beijing–Tokyo Forum is an annual forum for people-to-people exchanges between China and Japan. It was established in 2005 by China Daily, a Chinese official media, and Genron NPO, a Japanese non-profit organization, and is supported by the State Council Information Office of China and the Ministry of Foreign Affairs of Japan.

== Introduction ==
The forum was founded in 2005 and is held annually, alternating between Beijing and Tokyo. Since 2015, it has been hosted by the China International Communication Group and the Japanese Genron NPO. The forum covered various fields such as politics, economics, science and technology, and humanities. Attendees included experts, scholars, entrepreneurs, and media representatives from both countries, including former Chinese vice-ministerial level officials and above. The forum's annual public opinion survey report on China and Japan is known as "almost the only Chinese public opinion survey."
