= Masaaki Kanai =

Japanese diplomat

- 金井 正明

Director-General of the Asian and Oceanian Affairs Bureau
- Incumbent
- Assumed office 2025

Masaaki Kanai (Japanese: 金井 正明, romanized: Kanai Masaaki) is a Japanese diplomat, serving as director-general of the Japanese Foreign Ministry's Asian and Oceanian Affairs Bureau.

== Career ==
In November 2025, amidst a diplomatic crisis between China and Japan, Masaaki traveled to China met with Liu Jinsong, director-general of the Chinese Foreign Ministry’s Asian Affairs Department, to de-escalate tensions following commentary by Japanese Prime Minister Sanae Takaichi's remarks on Taiwan. Following the meeting, images of Masaaki appearing to bow before Liu went viral.
