= Diplomatic Bluebook of Japan =

Annual report of Japan's Foreign ministry

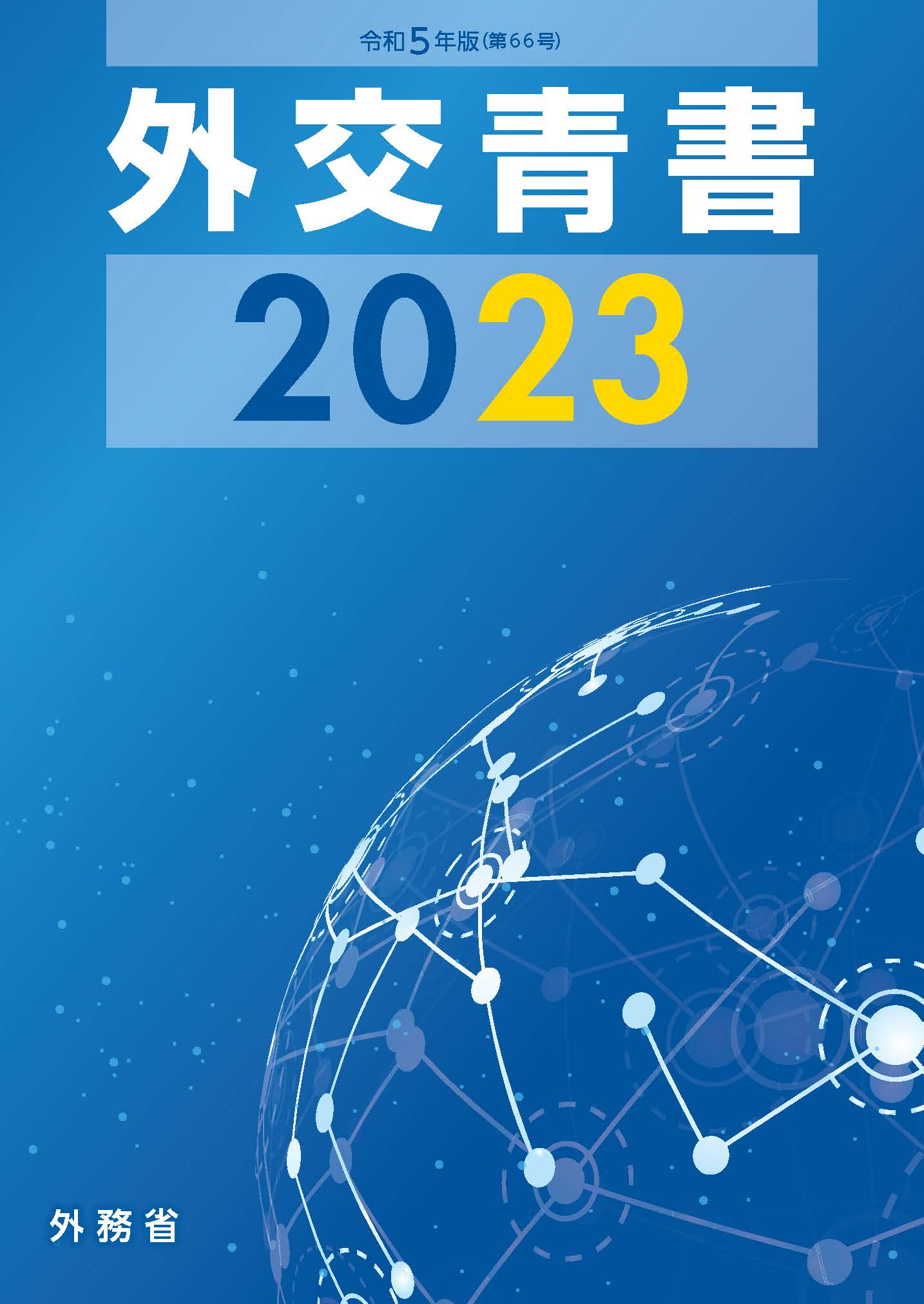
Cover of the Diplomatic Bluebook 2023

The Diplomatic Bluebook of Japan is an annual report on Japan's foreign policy and international diplomacy published by the Ministry of Foreign Affairs in Japan. It has been published every year since its first issue in September 1957. The general public have access to all past Diplomatic Bluebooks that are published on the Ministry of Foreign Affairs website. Translations in English, French and Spanish are also available.

== Summary ==
The Diplomatic Bluebook presents an overview of Japan's international relations with key neighbouring countries in their current situation. It describes the diplomatic policies that have been taken in response to international affairs surrounding Japan. The 2020 Bluebook states that Japan aims to "ensure its national interests in the political, security, and economic domains, as well as to maintain and develop a desirable international order that is based on universal values such as freedom, democracy, human rights, and the rule of law".

The Bluebook comments on global economic trends, potential terrorist and military threats, and various global challenges. For example, it elaborates the important role of the Middle East as a global energy resource provider and the risks of current political tensions in Iran and Syria. Particular emphasis is placed on the immediate countries surrounding Japan, and in recent years the Bluebook has paid close attention to the trends in North Korea and China, such as North Korea's recent ballistic missile launches and China's increase in military spending. In the 2020 Bluebook, the Japan-US alliance is described as "the cornerstone of Japan's diplomacy" and is listed as one of the six priority areas for Japan's foreign policy.

== History ==
The publication of Diplomatic Bluebooks began in 1957 during the economic boom in Japan. The Bluebooks not only demonstrated Japan's retreat from militarism towards peaceful diplomacy, but that it could also contribute to the international community even as it pursued its own agenda. It demonstrates how Japan is able to assure its national interests by respecting and upholding the national interests of others.

The Diplomatic Bluebook of 1991 states that one of the key objectives of Japanese diplomacy is "to clearly demonstrate Japan's willingness to participate in, and cooperate with international efforts to protect universal values such as democracy and fundamental human rights". This is reflective of Japan's continual efforts to make a "proactive contribution to global peace".

Regarding relations with North Korea (DPRK), the Diplomatic Bluebooks in previous years have repeatedly described the nation as "a grave threat". The 2018 Bluebook depicts North Korea as "an unprecedented, grave and imminent threat towards the peace and stability of Japan and the international community", continuing the discourse of previous Bluebooks which have stated the DPRK as a "threat of a new level" (2017) and "a direct and serious threat to Japan's security" (2016). However, the 2019 Bluebook marked a changing of expressions regarding Japan-North Korea relations. For example, it removed expressions such as "to maximize pressure on North Korea by all available means". The removal of these expressions demonstrated the Abe administration's change of approach from its previous tougher policy towards North Korea, primarily in response to the Hanoi Summit between the US President Donald Trump and North Korean leader Kim Jong Un, with the main focus of the summit being denuclearisation. Furthermore, the 2019 Bluebook described China as "one of the most important bilateral relationships" for Japan. This was the first time a statement of this nature had been made since Abe took office for the second time in 2012. In March 2026, Japan dropped this phrase amidst its diplomatic crisis with China, instead describing China as an "important neighbor".

In response to relations with South Korea, the Diplomatic Bluebook has included the phrase that South Korea is "the most important neighbouring country that shares our strategic interests" since 2016, arguing for strengthened military cooperation between Japan and South Korea to counter any potential threat posed by North Korea and China. Both nations are closely allied with the United States, but have a history of conflict and maintain a variety of disputes, such as the territorial ownership of the Liancourt Rocks. However, there has been a distinguishable increase of hardline language in the recent Diplomatic Bluebooks. In 2018, the Bluebook stated that the "Sea of Japan" is the only term with international legal standing for the body of water known in Korea as the “East Sea”. It also omitted the phrase "South Korea is our most important neighbour", stating only that "solidarity and cooperation between South Korea and Japan is indispensable for the peace and stability of the Asia-Pacific region."

In regard to the Russian Federation, both countries recognise a dispute over the legitimate sovereignty of the Kuril Islands. The 2019 bluebook's omission of Japan's claims of territorial ownership of the Southern Kurils perhaps reflected Abe's work towards settling a peace treaty with Russia. However, the 2020 Bluebook included wording of Japanese sovereignty over the Southern Kurils, contrasting the previous year's stance. In this way, the annual Diplomatic Bluebook provides a key insight into Japan's current international diplomacy and how it evolves over time. Japan redesignated the disputed islands as being under an "illegal occupation" in a draft for the 2022 Bluebook.
