= Neo-militarism =

Chinese Communist Party term

- Simplified Chinese: 新型军国主义
Transcriptions
Standard Mandarin
- Hanyu Pinyin: Xīnxíng jūnguó zhǔyì

"Neo-militarism" is a term used by the Chinese government to accuse Japan of a post-World War II revival of militarism. First proposed by a Chinese scholar in the 1950s, following the 2025–2026 China–Japan diplomatic crisis, the Chinese government has used the term to criticize the Japanese government. The Japanese government maintains that neo-militarism does not exist.

== Background ==
The idea that Japan revived militarism after World War II was put forward long ago. For example, in 1954, Mei Ju-ao, advisor to the Ministry of Foreign Affairs of China and judge of the International Military Tribunal for the Far East, wrote an article entitled "A New Stage of Japan's Remilitarization". The concept of "neo-militarism" was used sporadically in the media and academic circles of China before 2025. From November 2025 to November 2026, China's Ministry of Foreign Affairs has accused Japan of "remilitarization" or "neo-militarism" at more than 60 press conferences.

On 7 November 2025, Japanese prime minister Sanae Takaichi stated that China's use of force against Taiwan could constitute an "existential crisis for Japan", which led to frequent criticism from the Chinese government and state media. They believed that Japanese far-right politicians, represented by Sanae Takaichi, were trying to revive militarism. Some media and scholars used the term "neo-militarism". Takaichi's statement was closely followed by a report by The Sankei Shimbun, which said the Japanese government was pushing to change the class names of the Japan Self-Defense Forces to military designations, which Chief Cabinet Secretary Minoru Kihara said was following "international standardization". Chinese state media reacted by framing both developments as part of a narrative of Japanese militarization. On 9 November 2026, the People's Daily, the official newspaper of the Central Committee of the Chinese Communist Party (CCP), published an article entitled "New-Militarism Will Lead Japan to the Abyss Again". This marked the beginning of the use of the term "neo-militarism" by the government of China. Since then, the Chinese government has frequently used "neo-militarism" to criticize Japan. On 17 November 2025, Wen Wei Po, published by the Hong Kong Liaison Office, published a feature warning of the revival of "militarism" in Japan. On 18 November 2025, the Global Times published an article titled "If Takaichi Clings to Her Obsession with 'Neo-Militarism' This Will Only Lead Her Astray". In the article, three Chinese academics argued Takaichi represented a dangerous trend, with Xiang Haoyu, a researcher at the China Institute of International Studies, saying "While the current process of remaking Japan as a military power is different in form from the naked aggression and expansion of the period before the [Second World War], its ideological roots and political driving forces are of one continuous line with prewar militarism".

The use of the term increased significantly in December 2025. On 1 December 2025, Shangguan News ran a feature on "new militarism's dangerous turn". On 4 December 2025, the Institute of Party History and Literature published an article arguing that Japan had never eliminated militarism since 1945, and that "new militarism" was a "dangerous mutation" disguised in the name of "proactive pacifism". On 24 December 2026, the People's Daily published a carry piece accusing Takaichi of being "the spokesperson for Japan's new militarism trend of thought". On 26 December 2025, Lin Jian, spokesperson for the Ministry of Foreign Affairs of China, called on "all peace-loving nations" to resolutely curb "any dangerous acts of reviving militarism and shaping 'new militarism", remarks which were amplified by the China Central Television on the next day. Attention to the term further increased in January 2026, with the People's Daily publishing a commentary by "Zhong Sheng" on 9 January 2026 warning of Japan's right-wing "going further and further down the dangerous road of 'new militarism". Starting from 11 January 2026, North Korea started to accuse Japan of "neo-militarism", adopting a similar wording from China. In 2026, commentaries published in North Korea's Korean Central News Agency also used the term "neo-militarism" to criticize Japan. Xinhua News Agency wrote on 15 January urging the international community to "see through the mask of the 'peaceful nation'" under which it said the Japanese right-wing was hiding. On 27 January, "Zhong Sheng" published a second editorial, stating Japan's "new militarism" was "no longer just a dangerous tendency but a real threat." On 28 January, Guangming Daily published an article under the "Mingdi" column, warning Japan's "new militarism" risked becoming "a source of calamity for the region". China also criticized Japan's move in April 2026 to remove limits on military equipment exports as "neo-militarism".

On 14 May 2026, Chinese leader Xi Jinping reportedly used the term "resurrection of neo-militarism" to criticize Japan during a meeting with United States president Donald Trump who was visiting China. On 20 May 2026, during Russian president Vladimir Putin's visit to China, the joint statement signed by China and Russia mentioned "resisting 'neo-militarism' and 'remilitarization'", which means that China has written "neo-militarism" into diplomatic documents. Following Xi Jinping's state visit to the United States in September 2026, The Yomiuri Shimbun later quoted government officials as saying that during his state visit, Xi criticized Prime Minister Sanae Takaichi and her cabinet for supporting "neo-militarism". Trump in turn called her a “strong leader” and recommended that China engage in negotiations with her.

== Definition ==
Qiushi, the theoretical journal of the CCP Central Committee, believes that neo-militarism is an adaptive variant of traditional militarism under contemporary political and social conditions. It inherits the core spirit of militarism, which is centered on military worship and directed towards external expansion, and packages it in a more concealed and deceptive way. The Central Party School's Study Times believes that neo-militarism is a contemporary variant of militarism promoted by the right-wing forces in Japan after World War II, with the goal of breaking through the pacifist constitution, reshaping the status of a great power, and seeking external expansion.

The People's Daily believes that, politically, the ruling group of postwar Japan is still mainly composed of political families, professional bureaucrats and financial giants, and many of them are descendants of the pre-war ruling class. The interests of the government and financial giants are deeply intertwined. Militarily, due to the constraints of the pacifist constitution, Japan no longer directly promotes aggression, but instead achieves military deregulation by developing counter-attack capabilities and exercising the right of collective self-defense. Economically, the Japanese government obtains fiscal revenue through over-issuing national debt and increasing taxes, and then transfers it to financial giants in the form of huge military expenditures. Culturally, Japan has inherited the "cultural dross" of the pre-war imperial historical view, the theory of the superiority of the Yamato race, and Bushido, but it uses universal values as packaging and focuses on using social media to build information cocoons. Diplomatically, Japan has deepened the Japan–US alliance, promoted the Indo-Pacific strategy, and sought global operations of the Japan Self-Defense Forces.

== Japanese government reaction ==
On 25 May 2026, Japanese chief Cabinet secretary Minoru Kihara stated that Japan's policy of exclusively defensive defense remains unchanged, and that it will always keep its defense capabilities at the minimum necessary level. He added that China's claims are incorrect. On 31 May, Japanese defense minister Shinjiro Koizumi refuted the "neo-militarism" proposed by China at the Shangri-La Dialogue, stating that Japan has always followed the path of a peaceful nation and has received high praise from the international community, and will not be swayed by false claims. Koizumi also criticized China without naming it: "Think about it, There's a country that has a huge arsenal of nuclear weapons and strategic bombers. Japan has neither of such weapons, and yet Japan is labelled 'new militarism'?" At the same forum, Chinese major general Meng Xiangqing countered by saying Japan was not qualified to speak on defense cooperation because it had "not thoroughly eradicated the toxic legacy of militarism".

== Analysis ==
Professor Tomiki Kamo of Keio University in Japan believes that the government of China needs to establish itself as "on the side of justice and upholding the international order" for the sake of its own security. Therefore, calling Japan a neo-militarism is also to maintain the consistency of its self-narrative. Li Mingjiang, associate professor at the S. Rajaratnam School of International Studies at Nanyang Technological University in Singapore, believes that after Sanae Takaichi said "If there is a conflict in the Taiwan Strait, there will be a conflict in Japan," the government of China believes that the improvement of Japan's military capabilities will be detrimental to China. Therefore, it uses the narrative of "neo-militarism" to win the support of other countries and delay Japan's "remilitarization" process. However, he added the actual effect may be limited. Chen Yang, director of the Japan Research Center of Haiyi Think Tank in Beijing, believes that this move has achieved results, and many countries and regions have expressed criticism and concern about Japan's "neo-militarism."
