= Japan–China Friendship Parliamentarians' Union =

The Japan-China Friendship Parliamentarians' Union (日中友好議員連盟, Nitchū Yūkō Giin Renmei) is a supragovernmental organization that promotes strengthening of relations between the People's Republic of China and Japan. It serves as a platform for dialogue and collaboration between parliamentarians from both countries, promoting understanding and goodwill. This union plays a crucial role in enhancing diplomatic ties and facilitating discussions on various bilateral issues between Japan and China.

Its chairman is former LDP Secretary General Hiroshi Moriyama since January 2025. Former chairmen include Toshihiro Nikai, Yoshimasa Hayashi and Masahiko Kōmura.
