= Wu Jianghao =

Chinese politician and diplomat

- 吴江浩
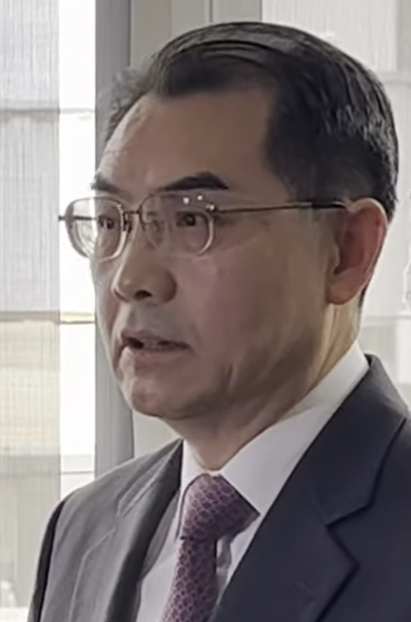
- Wu in 2023

Chinese Ambassador to Japan
- Incumbent
- Assumed office February 2023
- Preceded by: Kong Xuanyou

Director General of the Department of Asian Affairs
- In office 2017–2021
- Preceded by: Xiao Qian
- Succeeded by: Liu Jinsong

Chinese Ambassador to Sri Lanka
- In office 2012–2015
- Preceded by: Yang Xiuping
- Succeeded by: Yi Xianliang

Personal details
- Born: September 1963 (age 62) Taoyuan County, Hunan, China
- Party: Chinese Communist Party
- Children: 1

Chinese name
- Simplified Chinese: 吴江浩
- Traditional Chinese: 吳江浩
Transcriptions
Standard Mandarin
- Hanyu Pinyin: Wú Jiānghào

Wu Jianghao (Chinese: 吴江浩; born September 1963) is a Chinese politician and diplomat who is currently serving as the Chinese Ambassador to Japan since March 22, 2023. He previously served as the Assistant Minister of Foreign Affairs (2020–2023), director general of the Department of Asian Affairs (2017–2020) and Chinese Ambassador to Sri Lanka (2012–2015).

== Biography ==
Wu was born in Taoyuan County, Changde, Hunan province in 1963. After graduating from high school, he was admitted to the Shanghai International Studies University, where he majored in Japanese.

== Diplomatic career ==
Following his graduation, he was assigned to the China-Japan Economic Friendship Association in Beijing as a representative of the Chinese side and participated in economic exchanges. In 1984, he was transferred to the Beijing Diplomatic Service Bureau under the Ministry of Foreign Affairs. In 1988, he was transferred to the Department of Asian Affairs of the Ministry of Foreign Affairs and successively served as a staff member, attaché, and third secretary.

In 1993, he was assigned to the Chinese Embassy in Japan as the second secretary and later promoted to the first secretary. In 1998, he returned to China where he served as deputy director and director of the Asian Department. In 1998, when President Jiang Zemin visited Japan and met with Emperor of Japan Akihito, he served as an interpreter.

In 2003, he was again assigned to the Chinese Embassy in Japan, where he successively served as counselor and minister counselor. In 2008, he was appointed deputy director general of the Department of Asian Affairs of the Ministry of Foreign Affairs, and in 2011 he was appointed Minister Counselor of the Department of Asian Affairs.

From 2012 to 2015, he served as the Chinese Ambassador to Sri Lanka. After returning to China, he was appointed as deputy director general of the Protocol Department of the Ministry of Foreign Affairs and was later promoted to director general of the Department of Asian Affairs of the Ministry of Foreign Affairs in 2017.

In September 2020, he was appointed as Assistant Minister of Foreign Affairs. He and Vice Minister Luo Zhaohui were jointly responsible for Asian regional affairs, border and ocean affairs, and foreign affairs related to Hong Kong, Macao and Taiwan.

In February 2023, he was appointed as the Chinese ambassador to Japan, succeeding Kong Xuanyou. On March 21, 2023, he arrived in Tokyo to take up the position.

== Personal life ==
Wu is married and has a daughter.

Diplomatic posts
Preceded by Yang Xiuping (杨秀萍)	Chinese Ambassador to Sri Lanka; 2012-2015	Succeeded by Yi Xianliang (易先良)
Preceded by Xiao Qian	Director General, Department of Asian Affairs; 2017-2021	Succeeded by Liu Jinsong (刘劲松)
Preceded by Kong Xuanyou	Chinese Ambassador to Japan; 2023-	Succeeded by Incumbent
