= Cui Tiankai =

Chinese diplomat (born 1952)

His Excellency Cui Tiankai
- 崔天凯
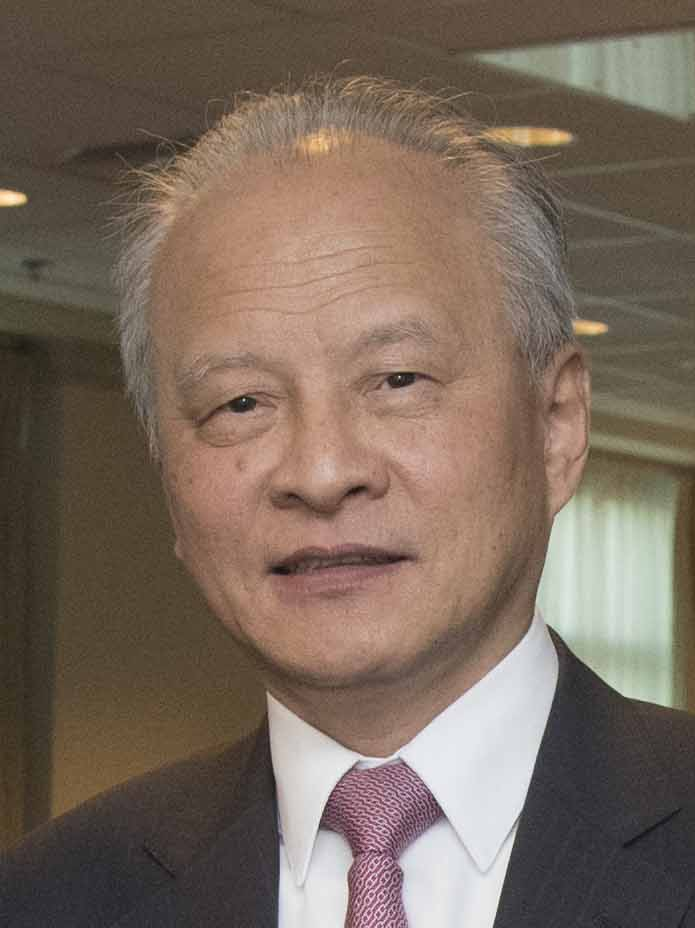
- Cui in 2018

Ambassador of China to the United States
- In office April 15, 2013 – June 23, 2021
- Preceded by: Zhang Yesui
- Succeeded by: Qin Gang

Chinese Ambassador to Japan
- In office October 9, 2007 – January 26, 2009
- Preceded by: Wang Yi
- Succeeded by: Cheng Yonghua

Personal details
- Born: October 1952 (age 74) Shanghai, China
- Party: Chinese Communist Party
- Education: East China Normal University (Undergrad in Foreign Languages); Beijing Foreign Studies University (Grad in Translation); Johns Hopkins University (MIPP)

Cui Tiankai (Chinese: 崔天凯; pinyin: Cuī Tiānkǎi; born October 1952) is a Chinese diplomat and was the longest-serving Chinese Ambassador to the United States, a role he filled from April 2013 to June 2021.

== Early life and education ==
In 1952, Cui was born in Shanghai, China. He is a native of Ningbo, Zhejiang Province, China.

Cui went to Shanghai Foreign Language School and graduated from the School of Foreign Languages of East China Normal University. Following his graduation from East China Normal University, Cui studied interpretation at the Beijing Foreign Studies University.

== Career ==
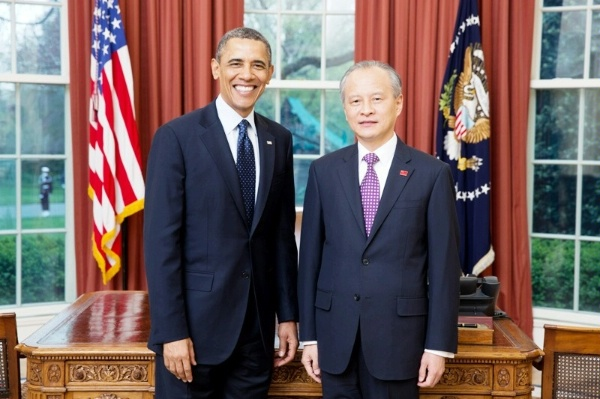
Cui Tiankai with Barack Obama in the Oval Office, April 2013

Following his studies in Beijing, Cui traveled with a Chinese delegation to the United Nations to work as an interpreter in the General Assembly. After working in the UN for five years, Cui returned to academia to pursue a postgraduate degree from Johns Hopkins University's Paul H. Nitze School of Advanced International Studies in Washington, D.C.

After graduating from Johns Hopkins University, Cui joined the Ministry of Foreign Affairs, first as a deputy director of the Department of International Organizations and Conferences, and then as spokesman for the Information Department. In 1997, Cui was appointed Minister Counselor to the United Nations, a position he held until 1999. Cui continued to work with the Ministry throughout the next decade and held notable positions such as Director General of the Department of Asian Affairs, assistant minister of the Ministry of Foreign Affairs, and Ambassador to Japan. In 2013, Cui was selected by the 12th Standing Committee of the National People's Congress, then appointed by President Xi Jinping as the Ambassador to the United States, pursuant to the National People's Congress decision. On 22 June 2021, after eight years, he announced that he would leave the position.

== Opinions ==
In 2012, the case of the blind activist Chen Guangcheng triggered a diplomatic dispute between China and the US. Chen was permitted to study law in mainland China before going to the US for further studies. When Cui saw the shortlist of the universities that the Americans recommended, he cried: "There's no way he's going to East China Normal, I will not share an alma mater with that man!"

On March 6, 2013, Cui was interviewed by reporters from China Youth Daily when he attended the National People's Congress. "The root cause of all problems in Sino-Japan relationship is whether Japan can accept a powerful and developed China." Cui then said, if Japan can recognize and solve this problem, all other problems can be resolved.

On October 8, 2013, Cui delivered a speech at the School of Advanced International Studies at the Johns Hopkins University. He said some Japanese believe that: "During World War II, Japan was only defeated by United States and her atom bombs. Therefore, Japan only needs to get along well with United States while ignoring other nations." "This is a downright incorrect viewpoint." Cui emphasizes that, "Japan was defeated by all the peace-loving people, including both Chinese and American people. There will be dire consequences if Japan is misled by incorrect viewpoints about past history."

On July 12, 2016, Cui spoke at the Centre for Strategic and International Studies following China's rejection of the ruling of an international tribunal arbitration case submit by the Philippines. He asserted that the attempt at arbitration was illegal as it was done without Chinese consent. Cui expressed his hope for future diplomatic resolutions to disputes in the South China Sea, and also expressed a wish for further more successful joint developments and activities with other countries.

Cui had also criticized the arbitration panel's lack of impartiality, describing Shunji Yanai (who had appointed most of the arbitrators) as a "right-wing Japanese intent on ridding Japan of post-war arrangement".

Regarding the COVID-19 pandemic, Cui states that "the job of finding the source of the virus is one for scientists, not journalists and diplomats."

== Other Events ==
In 2017, Tiankai Cui unprecedently attended the Bilderberg Group meeting in Chantilly, Virginia. Topics at the Bilderberg meeting often include China, Russia, and the establishment of an economic world order. As ambassador to the United States from China, he was in the same room as General McMaster, who was sent by Donald Trump as his representative. Other attendees included IMF head Christine LaGarde, the King of the Netherlands, and Lindsay Graham.

Diplomatic posts
Preceded by Wang Yi	Chinese Ambassador to Japan; 2007–2010	Succeeded by Cheng Yonghua
Preceded by Zhang Yesui	Chinese Ambassador to the United States; 2013–2021	Succeeded by Qin Gang
