= Genron NPO =

Japanese think tank

Genron NPO (言論NPO) is a Japanese think tank that was established in 2001. Its president and founder is Yasushi Kudo. Data from the think tank has been referenced by outlets such as Yonhap, Bloomberg, CNN, Financial Times, and The Christian Science Monitor.
