= Yang Zhenya =

Chinese diplomat

Yang Zhenya (Chinese: 杨振亚; 1928 – 8 September 2018) was a Chinese diplomat. He was born in Dalian, Liaoning. He was Ambassador of the People's Republic of China to Japan (1988–1993).

Yang died in Beijing on 8 September 2018, aged 90.

Diplomatic posts
Preceded by Zhang Shu	Ambassador of China to Japan; 1988–1993	Succeeded by Xu Dunxin
