= Xu Dunxin =

Chinese diplomat

Xu Dunxin (Chinese: 徐敦信) (born December 10, 1934) is a Chinese diplomat. He was born in Yangzhou, Jiangsu. He studied in Shanghai and at Peking University in Beijing. He began work for the Ministry of Foreign Affairs of the People's Republic of China in 1964. he was posted in Tokyo from 1985 to 1988. In 1989 he was posted in Indonesia. In 1990 he was posted in Singapore. Between 1991 and 1993, he was stationed in Vietnam, Brunei, India and South Korea. He was the 6th Ambassador of the People's Republic of China to Japan (1993–1998).

Diplomatic posts
Preceded by Yang Zhenya	Ambassador of China to Japan; 1993–1998	Succeeded by Chen Jian

== Bibliography ==
- Biogram na chinavitae.com
- Biogram na stronie Ministerstwa Spraw Zagranicznych Chińskiej Republiki Ludowej
