= Department of Asian Affairs =

Department of Asian Affairs of the Ministry of Foreign Affairs of the People's Republic of China
- 中华人民共和国外交部亚洲司; Zhōnghuá Rénmín Gònghéguó Wàijiāobù Yàzhōusī

Agency overview
- Jurisdiction: People's Republic of China
- Headquarters: No. 2, Chaoyangmen Nandajie, Chaoyang District, Beijing
- Agency executives: Shen Minjuan, Director-General; Mao Ning, Yao Wen, Shen Minjuan, Xue Jian, Deputy Director-Generals
- Parent agency: Ministry of Foreign Affairs
- Website: The Department of Asian Affairs

The Department of Asian Affairs (Chinese: 亚洲司; pinyin: Yàzhōusī; lit. 'Asia-Continent Department') is a department of the Ministry of Foreign Affairs of the People's Republic of China (PRC).

== Functions ==
The department focuses on countries in East Asia, Southeast Asia, and South Asia, other than the Asian regions for the Department of West Asian and North African Affairs and the Department of European-Central Asian Affairs. As of 2026, Shen Minjuan is the director-general of the department.

== See also ==
- Department of East Asian and Pacific Affairs of the Ministry of Foreign Affairs (Republic of China)
- ASEAN–China Free Trade Area
- Asian Infrastructure Investment Bank
- Boao Forum for Asia
- East Asia Summit
