= Embassy of China, Seoul =

Diplomatic mission in South Korea

Embassy of the People's Republic China in Seoul Chinese: 中国驻韩国大使馆 Korean: 주 대한민국 중화인민공화국대사관
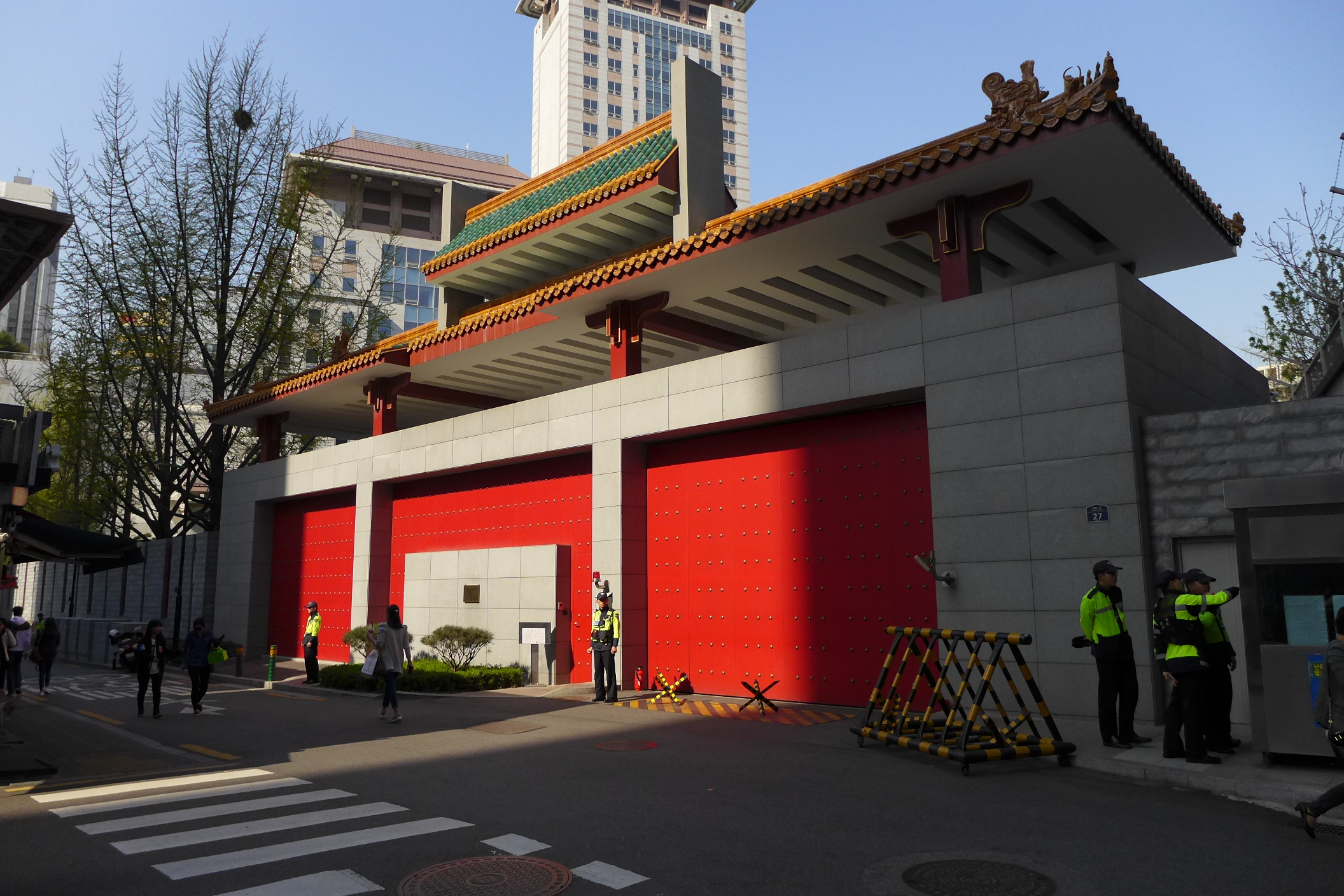
- Location: Myeong-dong District, Seoul, South Korea
- Address: 27 2nd St, Myeong-dong District, Seoul
- Coordinates: 37°33′44″N 126°58′58″E
- Ambassador: Xing Haiming
- Website: Chinese Embassy to South Korea

Embassy of China in Seoul (Chinese: 中国驻韩国大使馆 ; Korean: 주 대한민국 중화인민공화국대사관), is the official diplomatic mission of the People's Republic of China to South Korea. The embassy is located at 83-7 2nd St, Myeong-dong, Seoul, South Korea. The current ambassador is Xing Haiming.

It was originally purchased by Qing merchants and built as the "Qing Merchant Guild Hall". In 1883, it was renamed to the "Qing Mansion". In 1885, when Yuan Shikai went to Joseon to negotiate trade matters, it was renamed again to the "Prime Minister's Office".

== History ==
On August 24, 1992, South Korea established diplomatic relations with the People's Republic of China after severing diplomatic relations with the Republic of China. The embassy buildings and other assets were taken over by the South Korean government and transferred to China. In response to the Korean government's hard stance on taking over the embassy, some of the diplomats who worked there wreaked havoc on the building, including cutting it off from water and electricity, and destroying carpets and furniture. It was alleged that the new envoys who arrived didn't even have a place to eat in the building. Soon after, engineering and technical personnel were called from Shandong Province to repair the building, which was completed by January 1993.

The move-in of the embassy was officially complete on February 5, 1993. In 2002, due to the renovation and reconstruction of the Myeongdong site, the Chinese Embassy in South Korea temporarily moved to Jongno District, which then moved back in January 2014.

The newly built embassy consists of a 10-story office building and another 24-story dormitory building. The new embassy covers an area of 18,000 square meters, which is larger than the U.S. Embassy (9,871 square metres (106,250 sq ft)) and the Russian Embassy (12,012 square metres (129,300 sq ft)) in Seoul. Among the Chinese embassies, it is second in area only to the Chinese embassy in Washington (23,000 square metres (250,000 sq ft)).

== List of Ambassadors ==
#	Ambassador	Took office	Left office	Notes
1	Zhang Tingyan	September 1992	August 1998	
2	Wu Dawei	September 1998	July 2001	
3	Li Bin	October 2001	August 2005	
4	Ning Fukui	September 2005	October 2008	
5	Cheng Yonghua	October 2008	February 2010	
6	Zhang Xinsen	March 2010	December 2013	
7	Qiu Guohong	February 2014	December 2019	
8	Xing Haiming	January 2020	July 2024	
9	Fang Kun	July 2024	December 2024	Charge d'affaires
10	Dai Bing	December 2024	Incumbent	

== See also ==
- China–South Korea relations
- Embassy of South Korea, Beijing
- Diplomatic missions of China
