= China–South Korea relations =

- China: South Korea

Diplomatic mission
- Embassy of China, Seoul: Korean Embassy, Beijing

Envoy
- Ambassador Dai Bing: Ambassador Roh Jae-heon

The People's Republic of China (PRC) and the Republic of Korea (South Korea) formally established formal diplomatic relations in August 1992. South Korea was the last Asian country to establish relations with the People's Republic of China. In recent years, China and South Korea have endeavored to boost their strategic and cooperative partnership in numerous sectors, as well as promoting a high-level relationship. Trade, tourism and multiculturalism, specifically, have been the most important factors of strengthening the two neighbouring countries' cooperative partnership. Despite this, historical, political and cultural disputes have still played several roles on the relations between South Korea and China, especially with China being politically aligned with North Korea.

Both nations have had close ties that reach back thousands of years, which were especially cooperative during the Song and Ming dynasty, which cooperated with Goryeo and the Joseon dynasty respectively. The Ming and Joseon emerged after the invasion of the Mongols and shared close Confucian ideals in its society. Furthermore, the Ming had assisted Joseon during Toyotomi Hideyoshi's invasion of Korea, in which the Wanli Emperor sent a total of 221,500 troops. Joseon had also used Classical Chinese as a common script alongside Korean, and its central government was modelled after the Chinese system.

During the Cold War, China and South Korea were in opposing sides, with China supporting North Korea during the Korean War. Unofficial contacts between the two countries started in the 1970s and 1980s, both during the Sino-Soviet split, and official relations were established in 1992. Contemporary relations between China and South Korea are characterized by extensive trading and economic relations. China is by far South Korea's largest trading partner, with China importing goods worth $168 billion from South Korea in 2024, which comprised 25% of South Korea's total exports. 23% of South Korea's imports also came from China, worth $139 billion in 2024. In 2015, China and South Korea signed the bilateral China–South Korea Free Trade Agreement. In November 2020, China and South Korea, along with 13 other Asia-Pacific nations, signed the Regional Comprehensive Economic Partnership.

Relations deteriorated considerably after South Korea announced its intentions to deploy THAAD, a move that China strongly opposed. China imposed an unofficial boycott on South Korea in an attempt to stop them from deploying the missile system. The campaign resulted in a significant souring of public opinion towards China in South Korea. However, at the end of October 2017, the two countries ended the 1-year-long diplomatic dispute and have been working swiftly to get their relationship back on track since, strengthening exchanges and cooperation between each other, creating harmony of interests, and agreeing to resume exchanges and cooperation in all areas. All economic and cultural bans from China towards South Korea were also lifted partially as a result, with political and security cooperation, businesses and cultural exchanges between the two countries getting back to a healthy state. Upon the relationship's resumption, China and South Korea have been organizing presidential and governmental visits, working together on the Korean Peninsula, assisting with the development of other countries, and cooperating in numerous areas.

== Description ==
In 1983, relations between China and South Korea were normalized, deepening economic and political ties. Since then, China and South Korea had upgraded their relationship in five phases: In 1983, it was a “friendly cooperative relationship”; in 1998, it was called a “collaborative partnership for the 21st century”; in 2003, it was described as a “comprehensive cooperative partnership”; in 2008, it was considered a “strategic cooperative partnership”; and in 2014 it was called an “enriched strategic cooperative partnership”.

Since 2004, China has been the main trade partner of Korea and is considered a key player for the improvement of inter-Korean relationships. South Korea is perceived by China as the weakest link in the US alliance network in Northeast Asia. North Korea's nuclear issue and U.S. military support to South Korea have been the main threats to bilateral ties in recent years.

During the presidency of Park Geun-Hye, a “balanced diplomacy” was restored, which President Moon Jae-in has also followed. In recent years South Korea has avoided supporting the United States statements against China to avoid conflict.

== History of relations ==
=== Background ===
Diplomatic relations between the Qing dynasty and the Korean Empire were established on September 11, 1899, but relations were halted in 1905 as a result of the Eulsa Treaty that made Korea a Japanese protectorate and which was then annexed by the Empire of Japan in 1910.

Later, the Republic of China government recognized the formation of the exiled Provisional Government of the Republic of Korea (KPG) on April 13, 1919, as one of the participants of the Cairo Conference, which resulted in the Cairo Declaration. One of the main purposes of the Cairo Declaration was to create an independent Korea, free from Japanese colonial rule.

The Provisional Government itself was proclaimed in Shanghai in 1919 and the KPG moved throughout Chinese cities such as Hangzhou and Chongqing during the Second Sino-Japanese War to evade Japanese persecution. The South Korean government will later acknowledge China's role (even under the shared anti-Japanese struggle that later identified with the communist PRC; to which it played no considerable part) in facilitating the KPG. Numerous KPG memorial halls across China were restored and preserved as a cooperative effort between South Korea and the PRC to honor their shared history.

Bilateral diplomatic relations between the Government of the Republic of Korea and the Republic of China (based in Taiwan) were re-established in 1948, just after the foundation of the First Republic, hence making Nationalist China the first country to recognize the Republic of Korea as the sole legitimate government of Korea. During the Cold War, the People's Republic of China recognized only the Democratic People's Republic of Korea (North Korea) while South Korea in turn recognized only the Republic of China (Taiwan).

=== Korean War ===
The newly established People's Republic of China participated in the Korean War between 1950 and 1953, sending the People's Volunteer Army to fight alongside the Soviet Union against the United States and United Nations troops in October 1950. It successfully drove the invading UN forces out of North Korea, but its own invasion of the South itself was repelled. The participation of the PVA strained relations between South Korea and China. The Korean War concluded in July 1953, resulting in the establishment of the Korean Demilitarized Zone, and the eventual withdrawal of Chinese forces from the Korean Peninsula. However, US troops have still remained in South Korea to this day.

=== Cold War ===
Throughout the Cold War, there were no official relations between the PRC and ROK. The PRC maintained close relations with North Korea, and South Korea maintained diplomatic relations with the Republic of China in Taiwan. This hindered trade between Seoul and Beijing, because South Korea was unable to protect its citizens and business interests in China without some form of international agreements. Beijing's economic needs involving South Korea were initially eclipsed by those of Moscow.

==== Relations under Park and Chun (1961–1983) ====
In 1973, President Park Chung Hee announced his "Peaceful Reunification Foreign Policy" and expressed interest in establishing diplomatic relations with communist countries, including the People's Republic of China. Park initiated and President Chun Doo-hwan advanced a policy of establishing relations with China and the Soviet Union, and attempting to improve those with North Korea. China and the USSR had significant sway in determining the future of the Korean Peninsula. Good relations with old allies of North Korea were therefore integral to the Nordpolitik policy.

Seoul's official contact with Beijing started by the landing of a hijacked CAAC Flight 296 in May 1983. China sent a delegation of thirty-three officials to Seoul to negotiate its return. This marked the beginning of a series of casual exchanges of citizens. For example, in March 1984, a South Korean tennis team visited Kunming for a Davis Cup match with a Chinese team. In April 1984, a thirty-four-member Chinese basketball team arrived in Seoul to participate in the Eighth Asian Junior Basketball Championships. Some Chinese officials reportedly paid quiet visits to South Korea to inspect its industries, while South Korean officials visited China to attend a range of international conferences.

In the 1980s, economic and unofficial ties between the two countries were extensive.

==== Late 1980s into the 1990s ====
Other international relations changes in the late 1980s and early 1990s helped improve relations between China and South Korea. Following diplomatic normalization between South Korea and the Soviet Union, China's own improving relations with Moscow, and the simultaneous admission of North Korea and South Korea to the United Nations in 1991, China became less concerned with North Korea's reaction to China's improving ties with South Korea.

South Korea had been an ally of the Republic of China. On 24 August 1992, formal diplomatic relations were established between South Korea and the PRC. South Korea stated that the PRC was "the sole legal government of China". A peace treaty was also signed at the ceremony declaring an official end of hostilities between South Korea and China as a result of the 1953 Korean Armistice Agreement. On September 3, 1994, China withdrew from the Military Armistice Commission at Panmunjom, which left only North Korea and the United Nations Command as the only participants in the Korean Armistice Agreement. South Korea never signed the agreement.

=== 21st century ===
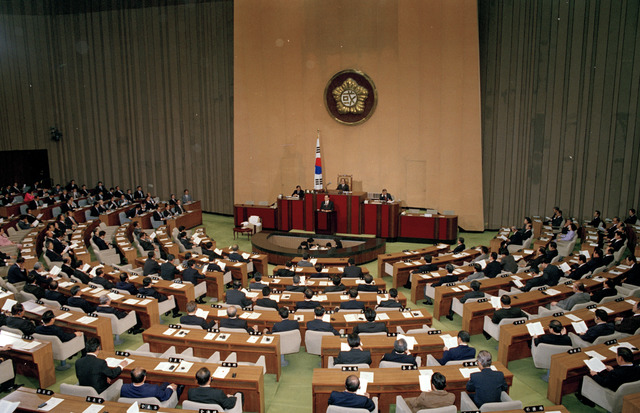
The Chinese President Jiang Zemin delivered a speech at the South Korean National Assembly in 1995

Furthermore, China has attempted to mediate between North Korea and the US; between North Korea and Japan; and also initiated and promoted tripartite talks—between Pyongyang, Seoul, and Washington.

On 29 November 2010, a United States diplomatic cables leak mentioned two unknown Chinese officials telling then Vice-Foreign Minister Chun Yung-woo that the PRC would favor a Korea reunified under the South's government, as long as it was not hostile to China.

Countries which signed cooperation documents related to the Belt and Road Initiative

It was announced on 10 January 2011 that the Ministry of Foreign Affairs and Trade (MOFAT) established two teams of China experts and language specialists under its department handling Chinese affairs in an effort to strengthen diplomacy. An analytical team will report on political, economic and foreign affairs developments in China, and a monitoring team consisting of seven language specialists will report on public sentiment in China. The Institute of Foreign Affairs and National Security (IFANS), a think-tank affiliated to MOFAT, also launched a centre dedicated to China affairs, which will act as a hub to collate research on China undertaken in Korea.

The Park-Xi summit in 2013 showed promise of warming relations, but this quickly chilled after China extended their Air Defense Identification Zone (East China Sea) over South Korean territory. Despite this, in July 2014, Xi visited South Korea before its traditional ally North Korea, and in their talks, both leaders affirmed their support for a nuclear-free Korean peninsula and the ongoing free trade agreement negotiations. Both leaders also expressed their concerns over Japanese Prime Minister Shinzō Abe's reinterpretation of Article 9 of the Japanese Constitution.

In 2015, Park attended the 2015 China Victory Day Parade as one of the most prominent guests alongside Vladimir Putin of Russia. The decision was controversial as analysts later pointed out that Park was the only democratic leader on the podium next to Xi and there were rumors of American diplomatic pressure on the South Koreans not to attend the parade.

On 23 March 2021, Chinese leader Xi Jinping and South Korean President Moon Jae-in agreed to promote dialogue between the two countries, to reschedule a visit by Xi to South Korea that was postponed last year due to the pandemic, and to work out a blueprint for the development of bilateral ties over the next three decades. In May 2021, Moon issued a statement remarking that South Korea would work with the United States on stability in Taiwan, which provoked a warning from China. On December 23, 2021, it was reported that senior South Korean diplomats, including Vice Foreign Minister Choi Jong-kun will hold talks online with Chinese diplomats. Zhao Lijian, a Chinese government spokesperson said that he hoped the meeting could "have a positive effect on enhancing communication and mutual trust and the promotion of bilateral relations". Just a week earlier, Taiwanese Digital Minister Audrey Tang revoked an invitation to speak at a press conference in Seoul.

Relations frayed under the presidency of Yoon Suk Yeol, who prioritized closer relations with the United States. After taking office in 2025, President Lee Jae Myung has focused on improving relations with China. In October 2025, he hosted Chinese leader Xi in South Korea; this was Xi's first visit to South Korea since 2014. This was reciprocated by a visit by Lee to China in January 2026, the first visit by a South Korean president since 2019. During the visit, Lee called for a "full-scale restoration of South Korea-China relations". During the visit, he criticized anti-Chinese sentiment in South Korea and those who spread conspiracy theories regarding China's involvement in election fraud in South Korea, which he said "angered Chinese people and drove them to turn their backs on Korea". He said that anti-Chinese sentiment harmed the country as it contributed to anti-Korean sentiment in China, leading to consumer boycotts of Korean goods and products. In November 2026, Lee visited Shenzhen to attend APEC China 2026. Xi and Lee held a meeting, with both leaders marking the 35th anniversary of diplomatic ties. Xi said he was willing to assist in "various efforts aimed at easing tensions on the Korean Peninsula, including a North Korea-U.S. dialogue", while Lee asked China to play "a constructive role" in the Korean Peninsula issues, which he said was a "do or die" matter.

=== Other exchanges ===
Active South Korean-Chinese individual contacts have been encouraged. Academics, journalists, and particularly families divided between South Korea and China were able to exchange visits freely in the late 1980s. Significant numbers of citizens of each country reside in the other. As of 2009, more than 600,000 PRC citizens reside in South Korea, of whom 70% are ethnic Koreans from the Yanbian Korean Autonomous Prefecture in China's Jilin Province and other parts of China, while roughly 560,000 South Korean citizens lived in China. As of at least 2019, Korea is the number one source for foreign students studying abroad in China.

== Economies ==
China is by far South Korea's largest trading partner, with a total trade worth $331 billion in 2025. South Korea exported goods worth $168 billion to China (including Hong Kong) in 2024, which comprised 25% of South Korea's total exports. 23% of South Korea's imports also came from China, worth $139 billion in 2024. South Korea ran a trade surplus with China until 2023. In that year, South Korea recorded a trade deficit with China for the first time since 1992.

Trade between the two countries have increased rapidly, especially after the China's reform and opening up. Between 1978 and 1991, trade between South Korea and China increased from US$37,000 to U$4.4 billion. By 2004 China had become South Korea's leading trading partner. By 2018, bilateral trade between the two countries had increased by a factor of 60 since 1991. After the United States–Korea Free Trade Agreement was finalized on 30 June 2007, the Chinese government immediately began seeking an FTA agreement with South Korea. The China–South Korea Free Trade Agreement was finalized on December 20, 2015. Tariffs on 958 products including medical equipment, transformers, etc. were eliminated. On 1 January 2016, tariffs were eliminated on 5,779 products for 2 years. Also in 2015, South Korea and China established won-yuan direct exchange markets. South Korea and China are both members of the Regional Comprehensive Economic Partnership (RCEP).

== Tensions between China and South Korea ==
=== Fishing and EEZ disputes ===
Since 2016, Chinese vessels with the proper authorisation have been allowed to fish in South Korean waters, but illegal fishing has become a recent point of contention. During the four years leading up to 2016, roughly 2,200 Chinese vessels had been stopped and fined by South Korean authorities for fishing illegally. In December 2010, the crew of a Chinese trawler clashed with a South Korean patrol ship, leaving one fisherman dead, two missing, and four coast guards injured.

In September 2016, three Chinese fishermen suspected of illegal fishing died after their boat was boarded by officers from the South Korean coast guard, who threw flashbang grenades into the wheelhouse to drive the barricaded crew out but ended up also setting the fishing boat on fire.

In October 2016, South Korea lodged a formal complaint with Beijing accusing two Chinese fishing boats of ramming and sinking a South Korean coast guard speedboat. The incident occurred on 7 October when coast guard officers tried to stop about 40 Chinese boats suspected of illegal fishing. On 1 November 2016, another clash took place west of Incheon where two Chinese fishing boats were seized. The South Korean coast guard fired warning shots on both occasions, but no casualties were reported.

The South Korean Coast Guard reportedly seized 18 illegal Chinese fishing vessels in 2020, 66 in 2021, 42 in 2022, 54 in 2023, and 46 in 2024.

In June 2023, the two countries entered into an agreement whereby South Korea would notify China of suspected illegal fishing in North Korean waters. China has banned its fleet from fishing there following U.N. sanctions against North Korea. It would in turn inform South Korea of the results of follow-up investigations. The two countries also decided to expand joint patrols, which are currently limited to parts of the provisional measures zone where boats from both countries can fish.

In December 2024, South Korean intelligence detected a floating structure built by the PRC in a disputed area of the Yellow Sea where the exclusive economic zones (EEZ) of the two countries overlap. The long-running dispute over fishing rights and EEZ intensified after South Korea opened a research platform in 2003 above the submerged Socotra Rock. Some commentators stated that China's installation of buoys took advantage of the 2024 South Korean martial law crisis. In February 2025, a South Korean research vessel was blocked from examining the structure by China Coast Guard ships, which sparked protests by South Korean veterans at the Embassy of China, Seoul.

In October 2025, more than 800 Chinese fishing boats were spotted in the Yellow Sea with more than 130 of these observed near the Northern Limit Line during the autumn crab season which led the South Korean Coast Guard to launch a large-scale crackdown on IIU fishing. It was reported that eleven 1,000-ton large patrol ships, eight 300-ton midsize ships, and three special response boats would be deployed for the effort.

=== Deployment of THAAD in South Korea ===
Chinese tourists to South Korea and year-on-year rate. From March 2017, tourists plummeted in retaliation for the installation of THAAD.

In late 2016, the United States and South Korea jointly announced the deployment of the Terminal High-Altitude Area Defense (THAAD), in response to nuclear and missile threats by North Korea. The move drew opposition from China and Russia. Stating that the THAAD will undermine China's own nuclear deterrent capability, China's Ambassador Qiu Guohong warned that the deployment of THAAD could “destroy” the China–South Korea ties in an instant, whereas the spokesperson of the president of South Korea warned China that deploying the THAAD is a “matter we will decide upon according to our own security and national interests."

With South Korea's decision in 2017 to accept the deployment of THAAD in the country, although China's government shied away from formal sanctions and measures, it has urged its citizens through official media to express their displeasure and ill will at South Korea over the move. Chinese citizens were allowed to gather to protest. The news media has reported of citizen boycotts of South Korean products like Hyundai cars, of South Korean goods being removed from supermarket shelves, and tourists and travel companies canceling trips to South Korea. After the 2017 THAAD deployment, a "Korea limitation order" (Chinese: 限韩令) was placed upon Hallyu. In China, Hallyu cultural events were canceled, Korean actors had to quit from their works and limited Korean media could be exported to China. The limitation order was lifted soon after, and relations cooled.

Unit sales and year-on-year rate in China. From March 2017, unit sales plummeted in retaliation for the installation of THAAD.

To relieve the economic strain the informal Chinese sanctions placed on South Korea, president Moon promised “three No-s,” saying that he would not participate in the US missile defense system, that he was not considering the additional deployment of THAAD, and that Japan-US-Korea security cooperation would not develop into a military alliance. For aims of a détente (a relaxation of tension), China and South Korea held a summit in Hangzhou, eastern China, on Sept. 5, 2016 with each party's leaders, CCP General Secretary Xi Jinping and President Park Geun-Hye, to discuss the issue of THAAD. During the summit, Park reemphasized that the THAAD deployment is only to be aimed against North Korea and that there should be no reason for China's security interest to be concerned. However, Xi reiterated China's firm stance against the deployment of THAAD stating that it could “intensify disputes". Yet, the two countries still emphasized the long history of their relationship and agreed that a stable and healthy bilateral relationship will benefit both countries.

=== Culture ===
In 2024, Koreans expressed anger after learning that China's Jilin Province had designated the cooking method for dolsot bibimbap, a variation of the traditional Korean dish bibimbap, as part of its regional cultural heritage. The move, made in 2021, was viewed by many in South Korea as cultural appropriation and encroachment by China, as the designation described the dish as originating from the ethnic Korean Joseonjok community in China. The revelation sparked widespread criticism online, with many accusing Beijing of repeatedly claiming Korean cultural elements as its own.

=== BTS Korean War controversy ===
On 13 October 2020, South Korean boy group BTS received the James A. Van Fleet Award from the Korea Society, an American nonprofit organization. During the ceremony, the band's leader RM made a speech about the Korean War, where he said: "We will always remember the history of pain that our two nations share together and sacrifices of countless men and women." This caused negative reactions on Chinese social media as some Chinese netizens supported a boycott of the band, and state-run outlet Global Times lashed out at BTS for what it perceived as bias and insensitivity to China's role on the other side of the conflict. This has led to backlash among some Korean netizens who accused China of exaggerating the situation and the online Chinese backlash against the group faded within a week, with the Global Times quietly taking down some of its negative articles on the band.

=== Controversies over names and history ===
The Chinese historical claims surrounding Goguryeo created some tension between Korea and the PRC. The PRC government has recently begun the Northeast Project, a controversial research project claiming Goguryeo to be a Chinese tributary state. This sparked a massive uproar in South Korea when the project was widely publicized in 2004. Reasons for launching the Northeast Project were reportedly the irredentist rhetoric promoted by some South Koreans over China's Northeast provinces coupled with North Korea's UNESCO application for registering Koguryo Tomb murals as its first world heritage site. Past president, Roh Moo-Hyun, expressed regret over China's Northeast Project during a meeting with Chinese Premier Wen Jiabao. He stated that although it is said to be conducted at the level of academic research institutions, it could have a negative impact on bilateral relations. He also requested that the Chinese government take necessary measures in accordance with the agreement made with the South Korean government. To counter the Northeast Project, South Korea's government launched the Koguryo Research Foundation and in 2007 rewrote the Korean Bronze Age in history textbooks to have started in 2000 B.C. rather than 1000 B.C.

Tensions from Goguryeo have also involved Baekdu Mountain, with claims made by South Korean activists and scholars that the mountain is Korean territory. In 2009, irredentism reportedly expressed by many South Korean tourists to the Chinese side of the mountain had irked local hosts. In 2014, celebrities Kim Soo-hyun and Gianna Jun received backlash after appearing in an ad for Chinese bottled water company Hengda bingquan because Hengda listed the source of its water as "Jang bai shan" (Changbai Mountain) instead of the Korean name. Both actors then sought to revoke their ad contracts but Kim later decided to continue with the ad, disappointing many of his fans.

In 2020, South Korean media outlet JTBC reported that a number of American college prep books described Korea as part of China during the Tang, Ming, and Qing dynasties. It also reported that Chinese website Baidu listed Korean activists An Jung-geun, Kim Ku, Yun Bong-gil, and Yun Dong-ju as Korean-Chinese and President Moon Jae-in as "Joseon" and "Korean" before removing "Joseon". The South Korean government said it was monitoring the situation.

South Korea remove the "China (Taiwan)" label from its e-arrival system following protest from Taiwan, which had changed South Korea's name to "Korea (South" in its immigration system. Taiwan will remain listed as "Taiwan" in the relevant fields.

=== Espionage and influence operations ===
American cybersecurity company FireEye claims that two hacking operations tied to the Chinese military, dubbed Tonto Team and Stone Panda/APT10, attempted to hack the South Korean Ministry of Foreign Affairs and other targets related to the deployment of THAAD. China has reportedly been engaged in economic espionage against South Korean technology companies, including Samsung Electronics and SK Hynix.

PRC entities have also been accused of attempting to influence opinions in South Korea through online propaganda campaigns. In November 2023, the National Intelligence Service reported that Chinese companies had established dozens of fake websites that mimicked legitimate Korean news outlets. They posted articles from other outlets without permission and spread pro-China and anti-US propaganda. The NIS has asked social media companies to remove the propaganda stories.

=== Other incidents ===
In 2022, South Korean authorities began investigating reports of Chinese police stations in the country following a report from Safeguard Defenders. Chinese officials denied having "so-called secret police stations" overseas. A restaurant owner accused of operating one also denied the reports.

In June 2023, South Korean prosecutors charged a former Samsung Electronics executive and his six accomplices with stealing trade secrets from Samsung in order to establish a copycat chip factory in China. The former executive had worked for 18 years at Samsung and another decade at SK Hynix before raising funds for his own semiconductor companies in China and Singapore, luring over 200 experts from Samsung and Hynix in the process. The same month, Seoul police arrested a Chinese researcher and charged him with smuggling thousands of files related to medical robot technology to China. He had worked in South Korea at a robotics lab for over 10 years and a hospital for five years, during which time he disguised the stolen technology as his own invention before applying for and receiving subsidies from China's Thousand Talents Plan.

In August 2024, South Korean authorities indicted a Korea Defence Intelligence Command employee on charges of selling military secrets to Chinese intelligence over a period of seven years.

In October 2025, China's Ministry of Commerce banned Chinese companies from dealing with five U.S. subsidiaries of Hanwha Ocean.

== Public opinion ==
=== Chinese public opinion of South Korea ===
A 2013 BBC/GlobeScan poll found that 44% of Chinese had a positive view of South Korea's influence while 28% had a negative view. A 2015 survey referenced in The Hankyoreh found that 66.1% of Chinese respondents had a favourable view of South Korea. A 2021 survey conducted by scholars from Rice University, the University of British Columbia, and the Lee Kuan Yew School of Public Policy had 43% of Chinese expressing an unfavourable view of South Korea, compared to 49% expressing a favourable view. According to a 2025 poll by the Chicago Council on Global Affairs and the Carter Center, 36% of Chinese people consider South Korea to be a friend of China, while 63% do not. According to a 2026 feeling thermometer poll by the Carter Center and Emory University, Chinese opinion of South Korea was on average 35 out of 100.

=== South Korean public opinion of China ===
Anti-Chinese sentiment is widespread in South Korea, with public opinion surveys showing South Koreans have an overwhelmingly negative image of China. According to surveys conducted by the East Asia Institute, unfavorable views of China in South Korea have increased significantly, rising from 16% in 2015 to over 71% in 2025. A 2019 survey from the Asan Institute for Policy Studies found that 51.4% of South Korean respondents held an unfavourable view of China, compared to 62.9% unfavourability for Japan, 47.9% for North Korea, 15.3% for the U.S. A 2020 Gallup International poll had 84% of South Koreans viewing China's foreign policy as destabilizing to the world, which was the second highest percentage out of 44 countries surveyed. According to a 2021 poll by the Hankook Research and SisaIN, China for the first time surpassed Japan as the country regarded most unfavorably in South Korea, with 75.9% expressing a negative opinion. The poll also found that over 58% of South Koreans called China "close to evil" while only 4.5% said that it was "close to good.”

According to a Central European Institute of Asian Studies poll in 2022, 81% of South Koreans have negative views of China, while 77% had negative views of Chinese people. According to a 2022 JoongAng Ilbo and the East Asia Institute poll, only 12% South Koreans consider Chinese people to be "friendly". According to a 2022 feeling thermometer poll, South Koreans opinion of China was on average 26.4 out of 100, which was lower than North Korea at 28.6. The least favorable age group towards China was South Koreans in their 20s, whose average rating was 15.9. A survey in 2025 from the Pew Research Center found that 80% of South Koreans had an unfavourable view of China, while 19% had a favorable view. According to a KStatResearch poll in October 2025, 22% of South Koreans had favorable opinions of China, while 69% had a negative opinion; most commonly cited reasons for negative opinions were the perceived behaviors of Chinese people (23%), China's one-party communist system (15%), the country's alliance with North Korea (14%) and perceived interference in South Korean politics (14%). Nevertheless, 53% disagreed with anti-Chinese protesters compared to 43% of those who agreed with them, though support was higher among younger people. A survey published in 2026 by the Pew Research Center found that 28% of South Koreans had a favorable view of China, while 71% had an unfavorable view.

Poor relations along with media reports and movies perpetuating a negative, criminal image of Chinese in South Korea has led to some online hate speech expressed in the top comments of major news portals. During the COVID-19 pandemic, more than half a million South Korean citizens have signed a petition lobbying the government to ban Chinese from entering the country. In 2025, South Korea saw anti-Chinese demonstrations by far-right groups in reaction to introduction of visa free entry for Chinese tourist groups, with slogans including "Korea for Koreans", "Stop the Chinese Boats" and anti-Chinese racial slurs. According to an October 2025 poll, 79.4% of South Koreans said anti-Chinese banners across the country displaying aggressive messages toward Chinese residents as well as accusations of election rigging made them uncomfortable.

== Resident diplomatic missions ==
of China in South Korea

- Seoul (Embassy)
- Busan (Consulate-General)
- Gwangju (Consulate-General)
- Jeju City (Consulate-General)

of South Korea in China

- Beijing (Embassy)
- Chengdu (Consulate-General)
- Guangzhou (Consulate-General)
- Hong Kong (Consulate-General)
- Qingdao (Consulate-General)
- Shanghai (Consulate-General)
- Shenyang (Consulate-General)
- Wuhan (Consulate-General)
- Xi'an (Consulate-General)
- Dalian (Consular office)

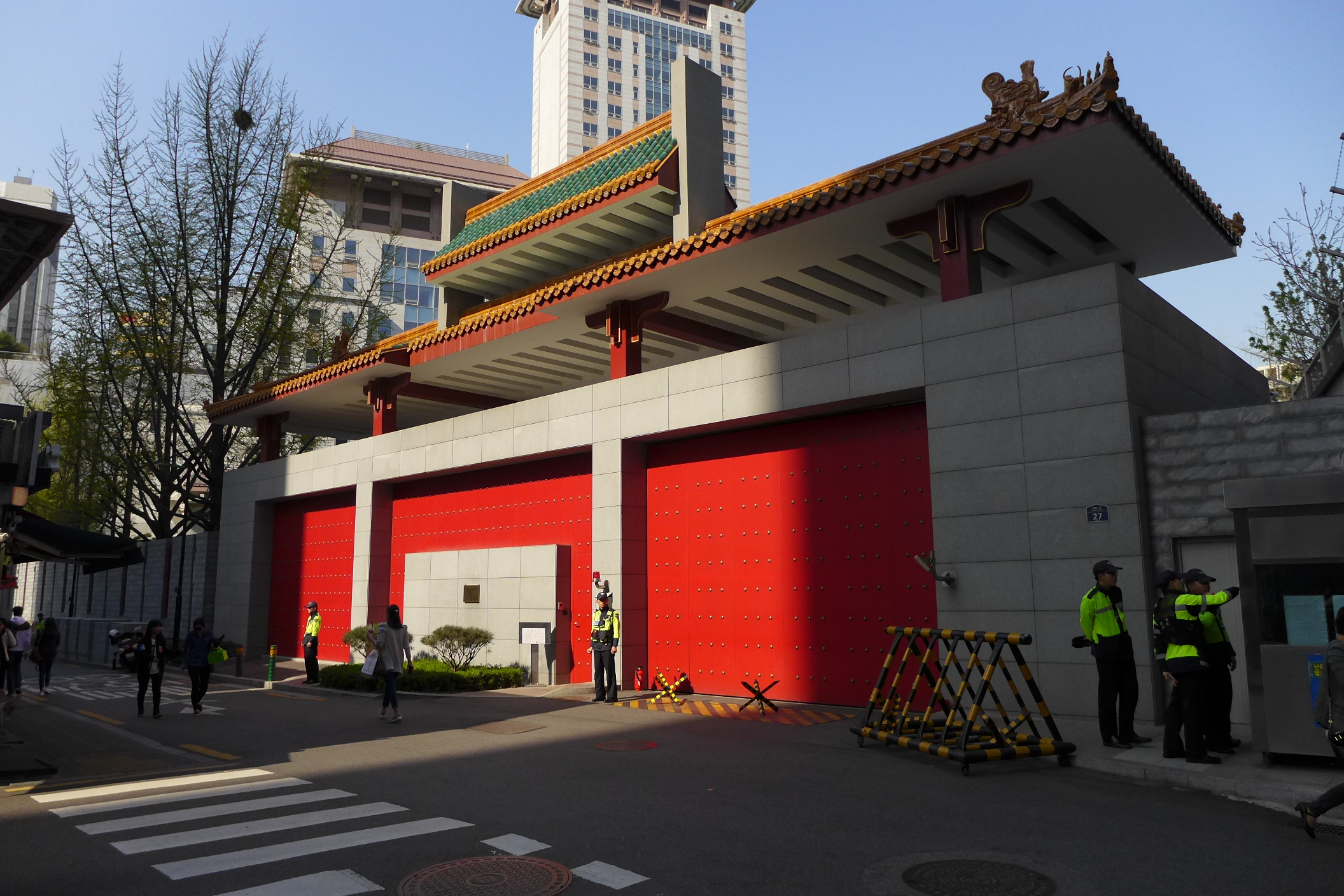
Embassy of China in Seoul
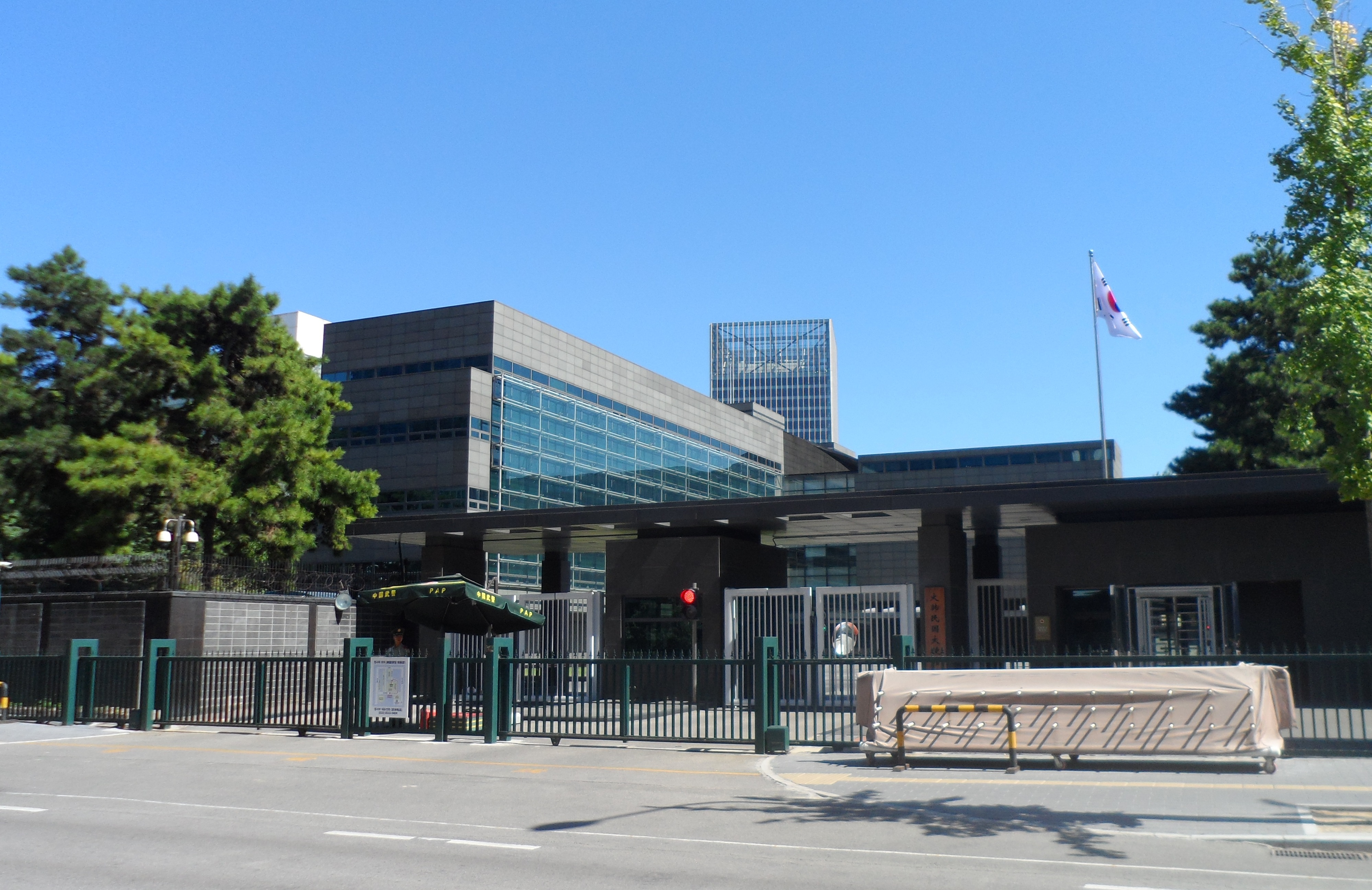
Embassy of South Korea in Beijing

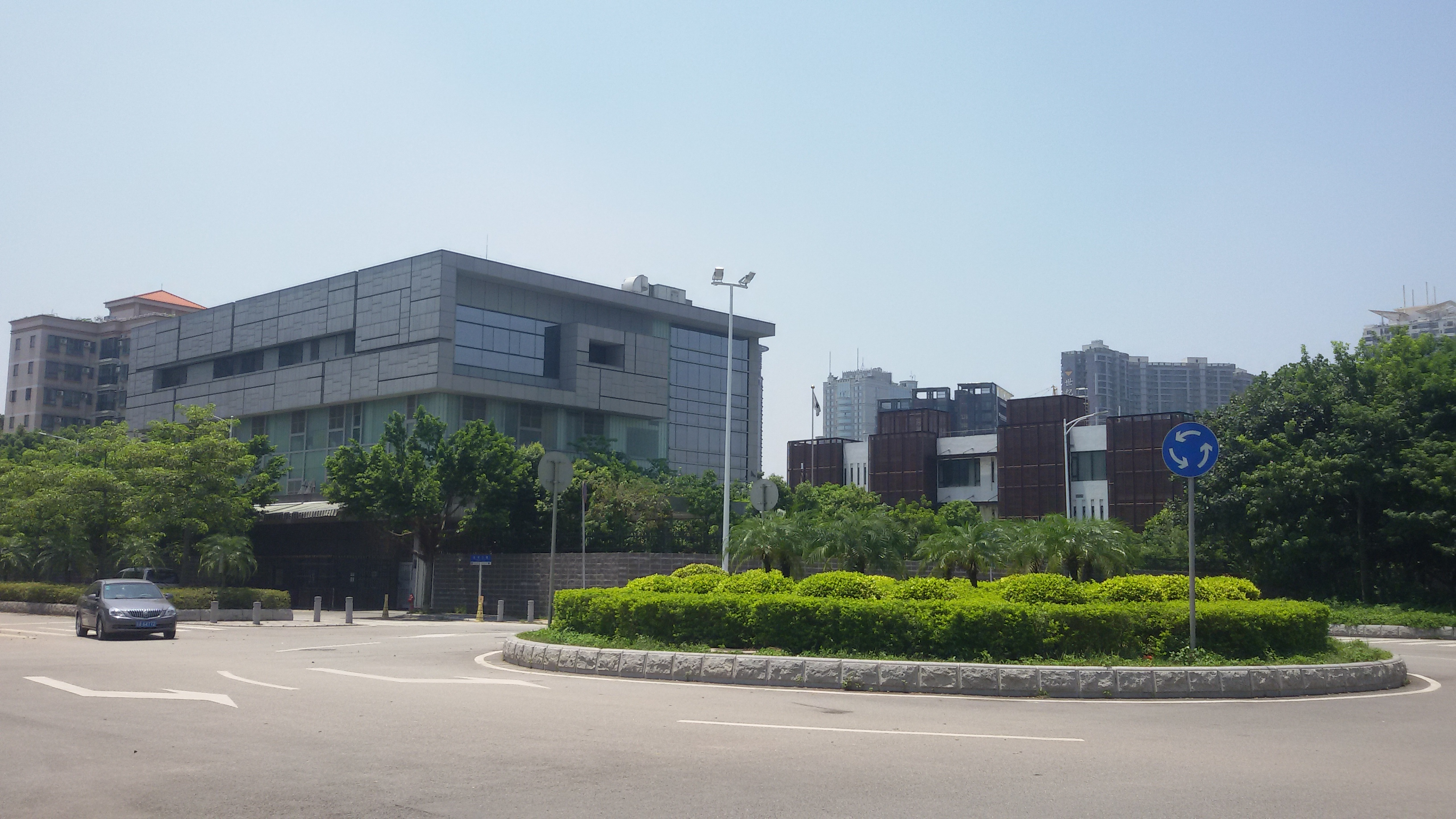
Consulate-General of South Korea in Guangzhou

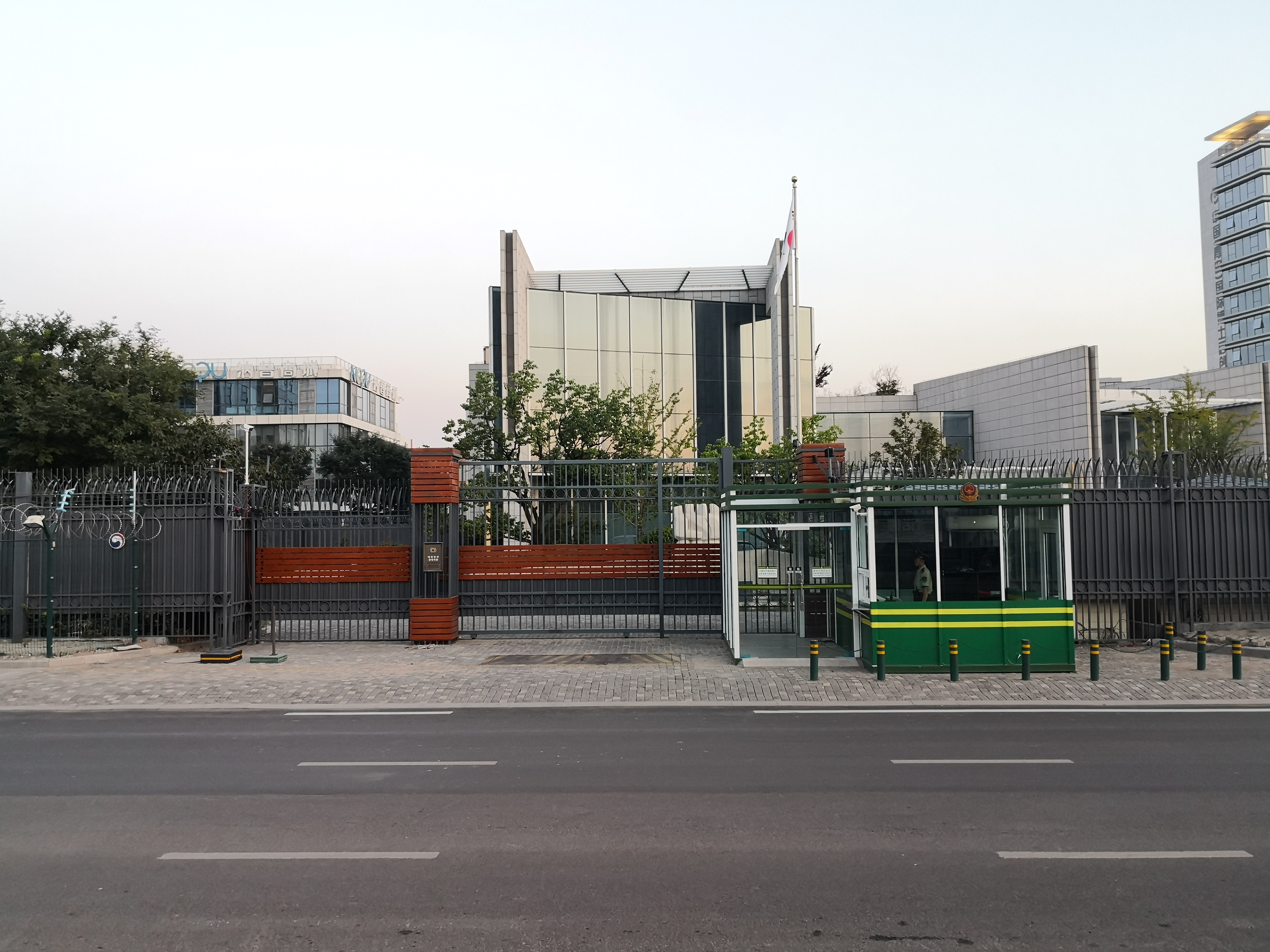
Consulate-General of South Korea in Qingdao

== See also ==
- 2010 Eocheong boat collision incident
- 2011 Gyeongryeolbi island fishing incident
- 2011 Incheon fishing incident
- China–Japan–South Korea relations
- China–North Korea relations
- Korean Chinese
- Nordpolitik
- South Korea–Taiwan relations
