= THAAD deployment by South Korea =

2016–2017 events

On 7 February 2016, South Korea announced consultations over the deployment of the Terminal High Altitude Area Defense (THAAD) system, which was officially announced to be implemented on 8 July 2016. The deployment was strongly opposed by China, North Korea and Russia. South Korea argued that this military deployment was only a defensive measure to deal with North Korea, while China believed that the deployment of the THAAD system would affect its national security and took a number of countermeasures against South Korea, including implementing a Hallyu ban. These measures also led to a rapid deterioration of relations between China and South Korea.

On 6 March 2017, the system's launchers arrived in South Korea, and the South Korean side said that the system would be in service as early as April. On 26 April, two launchers were deployed in Seongju County, North Gyeongsang Province, and on 12 September, the temporary deployment of the remaining four launchers was completed. All six launchers were confirmed to have normal fire control radar and were in operational status. On 22 November, China and South Korea reached a consensus, and the South Korean side stated that it "will not consider adding THAAD system, will not join the US anti-missile system, will not develop the trilateral military alliance of South Korea, the United States and Japan, and has no intention of harming China's security interests". Since then, relations between the two countries have gradually warmed up.

== Background ==
The development of the North Korean nuclear program was a major catalyst for South Korea's deployment of the Terminal High Altitude Area Defense (THAAD). Between 2009 and 2014, North Korea conducted two nuclear tests (2009 and 2013) and three long-range missile tests. A study by United States experts in February 2015 estimated that North Korea had 10–16 nuclear weapons in its stockpile and also estimated that North Korea’s fissile material production infrastructure had been modernized and expanded. In April 2015, Chinese experts said that North Korea may have 20 nuclear warheads and that it had enough uranium to increase to 40 the following year. In addition to developing weapons, North Korea made several statements targeting South Korea and the United States, including threats of a "pre-emptive nuclear strike of justice" and turning Washington, D.C. into a "sea of fire". In 2010, North Korea shelled Yeonpyeongdo in South Korea. The international community repeatedly attempted to resolve the issue of North Korea's program through talks, including the six-party talks. The United Nations Security Council passed resolutions prohibiting North Korea from testing any missiles or nuclear technology, but this failed to prevent North Korea's program from continuing to develop. From 2006 to 2016, the UN Security Council had passed three resolutions imposing sanctions on North Korea, including UN Security Council Resolution 1874. These multifaceted measures failed to achieve results. In December 2014, North Korea stated in a statement that "Now that the U.S. hostile policy with an aim to invade our republic under the guise of human rights has become apparent, the idea of denuclearizing the Korean Peninsula itself is no longer valid." On 16 March 2017, U.S. Secretary of State Rex Tillerson said during his visit to Japan that "The diplomatic and other efforts of the past 20 years to bring North Korea to a point of denuclearization have failed" and that a "different approach" is needed.

During this time, South Korea's main anti-missile weapon system was the deployment of the PAC-3 Patriot missile system. At the end of 2015, it deployed the M-SAM medium-range anti-missile system. However, it lacked high-altitude terminal defense equipment when dealing with large-scale ballistic missile attacks. The United States proposed to deploy the THAAD system on the Korean Peninsula in 2014, but South Korea has stated that it has not been asked by the US government to consult. However, China has repeatedly expressed its opposition and put pressure on South Korea. At a press conference on 28 May 2014, the Chinese Ministry of Foreign Affairs stated that "it will never allow tensions to arise at China's doorstep, leading to war and chaos", and also said that the deployment of the anti-missile system is "not conducive to regional stability and strategic balance". On 16 November 2014, China first mentioned that the deployment of THAAD would damage China-South Korea relations. Ambassador Qiu Guohong to South Korea said, "We firmly oppose the possibility of the THAAD system being deployed in South Korea. This will seriously damage China–South Korea relations." On 16 March 2015, Assistant Foreign Minister Liu Jianchao said during his visit to South Korea that "we hope that China’s concerns and worries will be respected." However, the next day, South Korean Ministry of National Defense spokesman Kim Min-seok expressed South Korea's dissatisfaction with China’s attitude, saying that "neighboring countries can have their own views on the possibility of the United States deploying the THAAD system in South Korea. But it should not try to influence our security policy." On 16 March 2015, U.S. Assistant Secretary of State Daniel R. Russel, who was visiting South Korea, also said that it was up to South Korea to decide "what measures to take and when to take them in its own joint defense", and also said that the US military "has a responsibility to consider what system" can protect Americans and their allies from the threat of North Korean missiles.

In addition to using the THAAD system, South Korea was also developing its own L-SAM long-range surface -to-air missile, which can intercept ballistic missiles flying at an altitude of 50 to 60 kilometers. However, the Defense Acquisition Program Administration (DAPA) of South Korea stated that the L-SAM system would not be deployed until 2023 to 2024. In May 2014, South Korea stated that it would not consider deploying the THAAD system and emphasized its own development of L-SAM. However, on 1 February 2016, it changed its attitude and expressed interest in the THAAD system. The South Korean Ministry of National Defense stated that its own missile, combined with the US anti-missile system, would become a powerful defense measure.

=== THAAD system ===
The Theater High Altitude Defense Missile (THAAD) is a defense system developed by Lockheed Martin. Production began in 1992, and the first contract was signed with the U.S. government in 2007. The main purpose of the THAAD system is to defend against short to medium-range ballistic missiles and can destroy harmful targets inside and outside the Earth's atmosphere. As of March 2017, the United States had deployed five THAAD anti-missile systems, one in Guam and the other four at Fort Bliss Army post in Texas. One THAAD system consists of a mobile launcher mounted on a truck, eight interceptors that can be launched and quickly reloaded, and a transportable radar surveillance system. The THAAD system deployed in South Korea this time cost about ₩1.5 trillion won per gun emplacement. South Korea was responsible for providing the base and infrastructure, while the United States was responsible for the specific deployment, operation and maintenance costs. Arms control expert Jeffrey Lewis said that South Korea needs to deploy two THAAD systems to fully cover its territory. As far as the current deployment location is concerned, North Korean submarines can launch attacks from the East China Sea, which is beyond the radar range. The interceptor missiles of the anti-missile system have a maximum range of 200 kilometers. The current deployment range includes several major U.S. military bases, but does not cover the capital Seoul.

== The THAAD deployment ==
=== Consideration and commencement of THAAD consultations ===
On 6 January 2016, North Korea conducted its fourth nuclear test, which it claimed was a hydrogen bomb test. A week later, South Korean President Park Geun-hye urged China to abide by its commitment to stop North Korea’s actions. In a televised address to the nation, she said, "China has repeatedly said publicly that it would not tolerate North Korea’s nuclear weapons. I think China is fully aware that if such strong will is not matched by necessary measures, we cannot prevent fifth and sixth nuclear tests by the North or guarantee real peace and stability on the Korean Peninsula." According to Yonhap News Agency, Park Geun-hye said at a press conference that day that, for reasons of national security and interests, the South Korean government would study the matter of introducing the THAAD system. Commentators generally believe that South Korea is making a statement and putting pressure on China, as if China does not take decisive measures on the North Korean nuclear issue, South Korea would deploy the THAAD system. On 29 January 2016, South Korean Ministry of National Defense spokesman Kim Min-seok said, "Our government will consider all measures to deal with the North Korean missile threat. If the U.S. military prompts South Korea to deploy the THAAD system, it will help our national security and defense." He also denied that South Korea had negotiated with the U.S. government. Some media reports pointed out that news showed that Lockheed Martin had visited South Korea in the past month.

On 7 February 2016, North Korea launched the Kwangmyŏngsŏng-4 Earth observation satellite at 8:34 a.m. local time and put it into orbit. This launch was widely regarded as a sign that North Korea had made significant progress in developing intercontinental ballistic missile (ICBM) technology because it shared similarities with the launch vehicle technology used to launch the satellite. Just hours after North Korea launched the satellite, Yoo Jae-seung, director of the Defense Policy Office of the South Korean Ministry of National Defense, announced at a press conference that South Korea and the United States had officially begun discussions on the early deployment of the THAAD system in South Korea. General Curtis Scaparrotti, commander of the U.S. Forces Korea, said in a statement that "North Korea continues to develop their nuclear weapons and ballistic missile programs, and it is the responsibility of our alliance to maintain a strong defense against those threats. THAAD can add an important capability in a layered and effective missile defense."

=== Deployment ===
On 8 July 2016, the two countries officially announced the implementation of the THAAD anti-missile system. On 30 September 2016, South Korea announced that the THAAD system would be deployed at the Seongju Golf Course in Seongju County, North Gyeongsang Province, 296 kilometers from Seoul, replacing the previously planned Seongsan Fort in Seongju County. The Ministry of National Defense stated that the location in Seongju County would maximize the effectiveness of the THAAD system and minimize its impact on the public and the environment. The political scandal and the subsequent impeachment of Park Geun-hye at the end of October 2016 changed the course of this plan. On 21 December 2016, South Korean Prime Minister and Acting President Hwang Kyo-ahn called for the swift deployment of the latest THAAD system from the United States, stating, "As we cannot wait even for a moment to cope with North Korea's nuclear provocations, we have to do what we can do first."

On 28 February 2017, Lotte Group signed an agreement with the South Korean Ministry of National Defense to transfer its Seongju Golf Course to the Ministry of National Defense for the deployment of the THAAD system. The Ministry of National Defense hoped to complete the deployment by May 2017. On the morning of 6 March 2017, the sixth day of the annual joint military exercises between the United States and South Korea, North Korea launched missiles, which once again attracted international attention. According to the South Korean military, North Korea launched four Hwasong-9 ballistic missiles at 7:36 a.m., which flew a distance of about 1,000 kilometers. Three of the missiles landed in Japan’s exclusive economic zone. The same day, the system's launchers arrived in South Korea, and the South Korean side said that the system would be in service as early as April. On 26 April 2017, two launch vehicles were deployed in Seongju County. On 12 September 2017, the temporary deployment of the remaining four launch vehicles was completed. All six launch vehicles were confirmed to have normal fire control radar and entered combat status.

=== Claims about detection capabilities ===
China claimed that the THAAD X-band radar had a monitoring range of 2,000 kilometers, which could not only monitor North Korea but also China, thus threatening the Chinese interests. Some commentators said that the Chinese military believed that THAAD would weaken China's nuclear deterrence. They said China believed radar of the THAAD system can track its weapon tests and the characteristics of specific missiles, and ultimately help the US military to contain attacks from China. They also said China believed THAAD could also allow the US military to obtain missile parameters that cannot be obtained through other means, which would contain China's nuclear strategy. However, other equipment experts abroad questioned whether China had overestimated the THAAD system, because although the system does not have specific numbers, everyone actually believes that it only has a missile defense capability of 100 kilometers and will not collect any electromagnetic signals. From a technical point of view, China also has a mature military industrial system and engineering knowledge. In response, Zhang Bohui, director of the Asia-Pacific Research Centre at Lingnan University in Hong Kong and a scholar who studies China’s nuclear strategy, said that the key is to look at politics in addition to science. One of China’s concerns is that it is psychologically wary. He pointed out: "The complete technical parameters of THAAD are classified, so Chinese strategic researchers have a certain lack of understanding of this. If they are confused, their instinctive reaction will be to make the worst-case scenario." He explained it this way. Therefore, the Chinese military would rather overestimate the capabilities of THAAD than instinctively react strongly.

The New York Times cited the views of several experts that China had an exaggerated opinion of THAAD's capabilities, which should be similar to what Taiwan and Japan had for years. On the other hand, Chinese officials believed that THAAD's location in South Korea would allow its radar to detect Chinese ballistic missile launches from behind during their boost phase and differentiate between decoys and warheads, sharing that information with the rest of the US-led network. This would erode China's nuclear deterrence, which relied on a much smaller stockpile than what the United States and Russia had. Missile tests in China usually pointed away from Korea, but that trajectory may also need to be reversed in order to minimize detection by THAAD. Chinese officials asked South Korea to downgrade the radar of the missile defence system, but no adjustments were made. Some media outlets have pointed out that the THAAD anti-missile system is "mainly for detecting Chinese and Russian intercontinental ballistic missiles, rather than dealing with North Korean missiles" because the system's defense range does not include Seoul and its detection capabilities are extremely strong.

== Reactions from China and South Korea ==
=== China ===
==== Government ====
The government of China showed a clear opposition to the deployment, expressing strong dissatisfaction in public on multiple occasions and summoning the ambassadors of the United States and South Korea to make representations. China has expressed its opposition over South Korea and US's decision because of its concern that the deployment of THAAD might be a measure by the US to contain China. On 24 February 2016, Qiu Guohong, China’s ambassador to South Korea, responded to South Korea’s initiation of consultations with the United States, warning that the deployment of THAAD could "destroy" the China–South Korea ties in an instant. He also stated that "the deployment of THAAD will bring about a vicious cycle, break the regional strategic balance, lead to a Cold War-style confrontation and arms race, and escalate tensions and instability." On 25 February 2016, Chinese Foreign Minister Wang Yi gave a speech at an event hosted by the Center for Strategic and International Studies, stating that having THAAD in South Korea would "shatter the regional strategic balance" and that the system exceeded South Korea's need.

On 9 July 2016, Wang Yi questioned the ulterior motives behind the deployment, saying that "the deployment of the THAAD system far exceeds the defense needs of the peninsula. Any explanation for this is weak." He also believed that the deployment would not help the peace and stability of the Korean Peninsula or the nuclear issue. On 29 September 2016, after South Korea announced the final deployment location, Yang Yujun, a spokesperson for the Ministry of National Defense, said that "necessary measures will be considered". On 3 February 2017, Foreign Ministry Spokesperson Lu Kang said that the deployment "damages the country’s strategic security interests" and "undermines the regional strategic balance". On 7 March 2017, Foreign Ministry Spokesperson Geng Shuang warned again that China will "take the necessary steps to safeguard our own security interests" and that and "the consequences will be shouldered by the United States and South Korea", while warning them to not "go further and further down the wrong road". On 17 August 2017, Central Military Commission Vice Chairman Fan Changlong told U.S. Joint Chiefs of Staff Chair Joseph Dunford that "wrong actions on the Taiwan issue, the United States deploying the THAAD system around China, U.S. ships and aircraft's activities in the South China Sea, the United States close-in surveillance in the sea and air near China have had a large, negative influence on bilateral military ties and mutual trust".

With South Korea's decision in 2017 to accept the deployment of THAAD in the country, although China's government shied away from formal sanctions and measures, it has urged its citizens through official media to express their displeasure and ill will at South Korea over the move. Chinese citizens were allowed to gather to protest. The news media has reported of citizen boycotts of South Korean products like Hyundai cars, of South Korean goods being removed from supermarket shelves, and tourists and travel companies canceling trips to South Korea.

=== South Korea ===
==== Government ====
The Ministry of National Defense of South Korea claimed that after the deployment of THAAD, it would not be aimed at any country other than North Korea, but only used to deal with the North Korean threat. "The deployment of THAAD will help strengthen the multi-layered missile defense system and enhance the missile defense capabilities of the ROK-US alliance against North Korea." However, some South Koreans oppose the THAAD system. According to media reports, members of the Seongju Anti-THAAD Struggle Committee in South Korea stated on 29 July 2016 that they would shave its head on 15 August to protest against THAAD.

South Korea stated that THAAD is not a political issue, but a national security issue. It said that given the escalating nuclear threat from North Korea, THAAD is the only means to protect national security and the lives of its citizens, and therefore THAAD could be abandoned. President Park Geun-hye pointed out regarding the deployment of THAAD that "THAAD is not aimed at any third country other than North Korea, will not infringe on the security interests of any third country, and there is no reason to do so. We have only taken measures for the simple defensive purpose of protecting the country and its people. The increasing nuclear and missile threat from North Korea is a very important and life-or-death issue concerning the future of South Korea and the survival of our nation. If North Korea provokes, the biggest victims will be South Korea and its people. To turn a blind eye to this threat is tantamount to watching North Korea launch nuclear and missile attacks on South Korean territory, causing major casualties."

However, Lee Jae Myung, the mayor of Seongnam and a member of the Democratic Party, criticized the move, arguing that THAAD, with only 48 missiles, is insufficient to counter the threat of North Korea's more than 1,000 missiles. Lee said "To be honest, deploying THAAD will hurt both us and China. No one will gain anything from it. The starting point of THAAD is wrong, so we have to reconsider it completely. Otherwise, our future will be gloomy, chaotic and insecure". On 30 March 2017, the National Assembly of South Korea passed a resolution calling on China to stop its actions against THAAD. On 30 October 2017, South Korean Foreign Minister Kang Kyung-wha stated during a parliamentary inquiry that South Korea, the United States, and Japan would not develop into a military alliance. South Korea's position of not considering additional THAAD deployments and not participating in the US missile defense system remains unchanged. In December 2017, South Korean President Moon Jae-in said in an interview with China Central Television that "South Korea’s position on the THAAD issue is consistent".

==== Media ====
Faced with the countermeasures of China, the three major conservative newspapers in South Korea, JoongAng Ilbo, The Chosun Ilbo and The Dong-A Ilbo, criticized China in unison. The three newspapers published editorials with titles such as "China’s countermeasures against THAAD deployment in South Korea require South Korea to respond wisely and firmly", "If South Korea yields to China’s countermeasures against THAAD, what will become of the country’s face?" and "Reducing dependence on China is the only way to stop China’s arrogance".

==== Public ====
After the government announced that the system would be deployed in Seongju County, thousands of residents protested. Many of them were elderly melon farmers. Residents were worried that it would endanger their health and destroy the local agricultural economy. Some residents said that after the deployment, "no one can live nearby, no crops can be grown, and the bees will not come." Although the South Korean Ministry of National Defense said that the radar system would not pose a threat to human health, these residents did not accept this assurance. Some protesters were also worried that their area could become a prime target for North Korea in the event of war. On 15 August 2016, 908 residents shaved their heads in strong protest. Opinion polls conducted in South Korea found less favorable perceptions of China.

== Chinese retaliatory measures ==
=== Hallyu ban ===
South Korean culture, singers, actors and dancers have become popular with Chinese youth because of the development of the internet and export of South Korean cultural content. In August 2016, rumors circulated that China had begun to regulate South Korean films, television dramas, and pop music, including banning South Korean artists from performing in mainland China and refusing to allow South Korean films to be shown in mainland China. Hong Kong and Macau were not subject to the restrictions, and Koreans of who were not South Korean nationals could still participate in mainland Chinese programs, such as Jessica Jung, Jay Park, Lee Su-hyun, and Lee Seung-hyun. In 2017, a Hallyu ban was placed. Hallyu cultural events were canceled, South Korean actors had to quit from their works and limited South Korean media could be exported to China. Subsequently, starting in 2017, Chinese online video websites stopped broadcasting South Korean variety shows. At the regular press conference of the Ministry of Foreign Affairs of China held on 21 November 2016, spokesperson Geng Shuang stated that he had never heard of the so-called "ban on South Korea" and that China had always maintained a positive attitude towards cultural exchanges between China and South Korea.

=== Travel ===
In January 2017, eight charter flights scheduled to travel to China were rejected by the Chinese aviation authorities without any explanation. South Korean media reported that several travel agencies in Beijing received verbal notices from the China National Tourism Administration (CNTA), requiring them to remove all South Korean tourism products from their shelves. According to sources, the CNTA summoned travel agencies on 3 March 2017 and informed them verbally or by phone that "all tourism to South Korea is suspended immediately, effective immediately. This applies to individual travel, pre-booked group tours, and bookings of individual air tickets and hotels." The agency representative stated that while South Korean tourism was abruptly halted, bookings made before 15 March and pre-departure deposits were still valid. However, starting 15 March, Chinese travel agencies would have "zero tour groups" to South Korea. Books in many hotels in Seoul were canceled by tour groups and individual tourists from China, especially the Lotte City Hotel, which is owned by the Lotte Group, which sold land for THAAD; 30% of the reservations at the hotel were canceled. On 11 March 2017, after the Costa Serena arrived at the outer port of Jeju Island, more than 3,400 tour group tourists from China on board refused to disembark. At the time, the immigration, customs and quarantine personnel in Jeju Island complained about the behavior of some tourists from China. This was the first time in more than 20 years since international cruise ships docked in Jeju Island in the late 1990s that passengers had collectively refused to disembark.

Chinese tourism dropped 39.4% (compared to March 2016) in March in 2017. The Chinese tourism boycott cost South Korea around $6.5 billion from March to November 2017. On 3 November 2017, the CNTA issued a travel warning for South Korea, advising tourists to "carefully choose their destinations". In November 2017, China started to allow travel agencies in Beijing and Shandong to partly resume sales of group tours to South Korea, though travel executives were told to not include units of Lotte Group in their travel packages. On 2 December 2017, after being suspended for more than eight months, tour groups from mainland China to South Korea resumed. A tour group of 32 people from mainland China arrived at Incheon International Airport in South Korea from Beijing in the evening and were welcomed by staff of South Korean travel agencies and duty-free shops. The tour members took photos holding banners that read "Breaking the Ice: First Tour Group to South Korea". The tour members expressed their hope that the people of the two countries would have frequent exchanges and enhance friendship.

=== Boycott of Lotte Group ===
South Korean conglomerate Lotte Group became a particular focus. Lotte had agreed to an exchange of land, a golf course in Seongju, with the South Korean government that will be used for the THAAD deployment. In addition to a consumer boycott of Lotte stores in China, municipal authorities suddenly discovered that Lotte stores and factories to be in contravention of fire safety regulations and other local ordinances which has resulted in the closure of 75 out of 99 Lotte supermarkets. Many Chinese netizens could not accept Lotte's behavior and a large number of comments boycotting Lotte Group appeared on social media. Several stores also announced that they would stop selling Lotte Group products. On the morning of 26 February 2017, more than 20 people appeared in front of the Gangnam Lotte Mart in Jilin City, holding banners demanding that Lotte "get out of China". Previously, on 12 January 2017, Lotte's flagship store on Tmall was completely shut down. On 1 March, the manufacturer of Weilong brand spicy strips announced on Weibo that the products sold by Lotte Mart would be removed from the shelves in accordance with procedures; on 4 March, some consumers in Jiangsu went to Lotte Mart to shop with their consumer cards, and the scene was extremely popular. There were rumors that the total consumption on that day exceeded ¥11 million renminbi. Local consumers said that they would not go to the store to shop after using up the balance on their cards.

While some people in China were boycotting Lotte, there was also confusion in the boycott. On 28 February, the official Weibo account of Rakuten Markets in Japan issued a statement saying that the company has no relation to Lotte Company of South Korea except for the Chinese characters. Ta Kung Pao commented that Lotte "makes a lot of money while doing despicable things that harm people’s safety". On 1 March 2017, Lotte announced that its Lotte Duty Free website had been attacked by hackers in China. On the same day, Lotte China’s official website also crashed and was also attacked by hackers. Lotte China subsequently announced that the website was being upgraded. Some rumors about the group have also appeared online. One of them claims that Lotte Group Chairman Shin Dong-bin said in an interview with the South Korean news outlet "Global Eye" that Chinese people are "spineless and bloodless". Lotte then claimed through mainland Chinese media: "This is a fabricated, illogical, and absurd false information" and "There is no such news media outlet as "Global Eye" in South Korea".

Reuters reported that more than 20 Lotte stores in China were shut down by Chinese authorities after inspections, with the authorities saying that China was "putting pressure on the group amid diplomatic standoffs between the two countries." A Lotte supermarket in Beijing was fined for publishing illegal advertisements. In addition, a Lotte Mart supermarket in Wuhu, Anhui Province, was fined ¥20,000 renminbi and had its equipment confiscated for illegally setting up a radio station.

However, the strong boycott was quelled by the authorities about a week later. Many protesters who marched in the streets with banners that read "Resist America, Resist Korea" were driven away when they went to Lotte. Lotte supermarkets were subsequently heavily guarded by the police. Some people also took advantage of the boycott to steal or misappropriate goods and were arrested for theft. A female live streamer dressed as a Red Guard on the Internet had her video taken down and was criticized by the media for "not understanding political sensitivity" and "being weird". On 24 March, Lotte posted the slogan "Because we understand, we wait" outside its major hotels, shopping malls and duty-free shops in South Korea. The South Korean newspaper JoongAng Ilbo said that the South Korean government had no hope of intervention and "Lotte, helpless, is playing the emotional card".

In response to this incident, the spokesperson of the Ministry of Foreign Affairs of China has repeatedly stated: "China welcomes foreign companies to invest and do business in China and has always respected and protected the legitimate rights and interests of foreign companies in China. At the same time, we also emphasize that the relevant companies must operate legally and in compliance with regulations in China. Finally, I would like to say that whether foreign companies succeed in operating in China is determined by the Chinese market and Chinese consumers."

In July 2022, Lotte decided to sell its last store in mainland China, located in Chengdu. This meant that Lotte would completely withdraw from the mainland China market.

=== Other measures ===
Hyundai unit sales and year-on-year rate in China. From March 2017, unit sales plummeted in retaliation for the installation of THAAD.

On 29 December 2016, China announced a list of cars eligible for subsidies, in which cars with batteries from Samsung and LG were removed from the list. Hyundai's sales in China have decreased by nearly half. March 2017 sales of Hyundai and its sister brand Kia Motors in China plunged 52 per cent from a year earlier to 72,000 vehicles, the lowest level since 2014.

=== South Korean countermeasures ===
On 1 February 2017, media reported that the South Korean immigration authorities stopped issuing or extending visas to Chinese teachers at Confucius Institutes in South Korea. The South Korean side stated that these Chinese teachers' signing of labor contracts with China and receiving wages from China did not meet the standards for issuing their education visas, and therefore their visas were not extended. In March 2017, some South Korean netizens began to boycott Chinese products as "retaliation" against Chinese netizens' boycott of South Korean goods.

== International reactions ==
- Japan: Deputy Chief Cabinet Secretary Kōichi Hagiuda welcomed the decision by the United States and South Korea to deploy the THAAD system at a press conference on 8 July 2016. He said, "The cooperation between the United States and South Korea is conducive to regional stability and peace, and our country supports this decision." He also believes that "the deployment decision was made by the United States and South Korea. I will not comment on third countries." Some reports believe that Japan also wants the United States to deploy the THAAD system on its territory.
- North Korea: On 11 July 2016, North Korea issued a "grave warning from the artillery bureau of the Joint Chiefs of the Staff of the Korean People's Army" regarding THAAD, stating "the THAAD weapon system is a method of US aggression aimed at world domination. From the moment that its location in South Korea is decided, we will respond with force in order to crush it". It added "The US and South Korea have the evil intention of setting up an Asian version of NATO centered on their alliance in order to check other powers in Northeast Asia and to seize military hegemony", while adding U.S. actions had sparked "the shared opposition and rejection by several countries around the world" and "a backlash from countries around the Korean Peninsula".
- Russia: On 14 July 2016, Russian Foreign Ministry spokeswoman Maria Zakharova said regarding the news about South Korea's deployment of the THAAD anti-missile system, "We continue to closely monitor developments on the Korean Peninsula and in its surrounding areas, and remain open to consultations. All parties and countries interested in consultations are welcome to discuss the latest situation and various issues with us."
- United States: The U.S. Embassy in China stated that THAAD is a purely defensive system designed to counter short- and medium-range ballistic missiles and would not harm the interests of China or Russia. The U.S. stated that the deployment of the THAAD is "purely a defensive measure... only aimed at North Korea" and has no intention to threaten China's security interests. John Kirby, a spokesman for the U.S. State Department, said that the THAAD system is a completely defensive system and is aimed at the threat posed by North Korea, adding that China should not worry that THAAD would harm its interests, and the joint deployment of the THAAD system by the U.S. and South Korea would not cause mutual suspicion between the U.S. and China. In addition, Kirby said that he was not clear about the specific timetable for the deployment of the THAAD system. On 23 March 2017, Ted Yoho, Chairman of the House Foreign Affairs Subcommittee on Asia and the Pacific, submitted a bipartisan bill condemning China’s retaliation against the deployment of THAAD in South Korea by the United States and South Korea. On 28 April 2017, U.S. President Donald Trump said in a media interview that South Korea should pay $1 billion for the installation of the system.

== Aftermath ==
=== Reconciliation between China and South Korea ===
For aims of a détente (a relaxation of tension), China and South Korea held a summit in Hangzhou, eastern China, on 5 September 2016 with each party's leaders, Chinese leader Xi Jinping and South Korean President Park Geun-Hye, to discuss the issue of THAAD. During the summit, Park reemphasized that the THAAD deployment is only to be aimed against North Korea and that there should be no reason for China's security interest to be concerned. However, Xi reiterated China's firm stance against the deployment of THAAD stating that it could "intensify disputes". Yet, the two countries still emphasized the long history of their relationship and agreed that a stable and healthy bilateral relationship will benefit both countries.

On 6 July 2017, South Korean President Moon Jae-in and Chinese President Xi Jinping held their first talks at the G20 summit in Hamburg, Germany. According to South Korea's Dong-A Ilbo, Chung Eui-yong, South Korea's National Security Advisor, and Yang Jiechi, China's State Councilor in charge of foreign affairs, held a highly confidential meeting in Hamburg, lasting one and a half hours. During the meeting, Chung emphasized "trust between the two countries." Although no consensus was reached, the two leaders, through continuous communication since July, including via hotline, have gradually narrowed their differences, creating a springboard for restoring trust. They ultimately reached an agreement to "issue a joint document to move to the next stage." The second phase involved detailed coordination between Nam Gwan-pyo, the Second Deputy Director of the National Security Office at the Blue House of South Korea, and Kong Xuanyou, Assistant Minister of Foreign Affairs of China, on the text of the agreement. Because every word and sentence in the agreement was highly sensitive, Nam Gwan-pyo frequently traveled to China to conduct direct, face-to-face negotiations with Kong Xuanyou. In addition, Chung Eui-yong and Nam Gwan-pyo would meet with Qiu Guohong, the Chinese ambassador to South Korea, at any time in Seoul. On 31 October 2017, the Ministry of Foreign Affairs of China and the Ministry of Foreign Affairs of South Korea simultaneously released the results of their communication on bilateral relations on their official websites.

The foreign ministries of both countries stated that South Korea and China held inter-ministerial communication on the Korean Peninsula issue through channels including Nam Gwan-pyo, the Second Deputy Director of the National Security Office of the Blue House, and Kong Xuanyou, Assistant Minister of Foreign Affairs and Special Representative of the Chinese Government on Korean Peninsula Affairs. Both sides expressed their high regard for China–South Korea relations and their willingness to promote the development of the China–South Korea strategic cooperative partnership in accordance with the spirit of bilateral joint documents. Both sides agreed that strengthening exchanges and cooperation between the two countries is in their common interest and agreed to promote the early return of exchanges and cooperation in various fields to the normal track of development. Both sides also stated that South Korea recognizes China's position and concerns on the THAAD issue and clearly stated that the THAAD system deployed in South Korea, according to its original deployment purpose, is not directed against any third country, and therefore does not harm China's strategic security interests. China, based on its position of safeguarding national security, reiterated its opposition to the deployment of the THAAD system in South Korea. At the same time, China noted South Korea's stated position and hoped that South Korea would properly handle the relevant issues. Both sides agreed to communicate through military channels on issues related to THAAD that are of concern to China. In addition, both sides reaffirmed the principles of achieving denuclearization of the Korean Peninsula and peacefully resolving the North Korean nuclear issue, and reiterated their commitment to continuing to promote the resolution of the North Korean nuclear issue through all diplomatic means. Both sides expressed their intention to further strengthen strategic communication and cooperation in this regard.

On 22 November 2017, Chinese Foreign Minister Wang Yi held talks with South Korean Foreign Minister Kang Kyung-wha in Beijing and reached an agreement on the "three No-s", namely that South Korea would:

1. Not consider adding a THAAD system
2. Not join the U.S. missile defense system
3. Not develop a trilateral military alliance between South Korea, the United States, and Japan

On the afternoon of 12 April 2018, the anti-THAAD group in Seongju County, South Korea, reached an agreement with the South Korean Ministry of National Defense. According to the agreement, the South Korean military would remove all construction equipment from the THAAD base and suspend the delivery of additional equipment. On 2 August 2019, the Ministry of National Defense of South Korea and the U.S. Forces Korea Command launched a project to renovate the barracks of the THAAD base in Seongju County, North Gyeongsang Province.

=== Further negotiations ===
After Yoon Suk Yeol came to power in the 2022 South Korean presidential election, he demanded the expansion of the THAAD deployment, which drew criticism from China. Chinese Foreign Minister Wang Yi and South Korean Foreign Minister Park Jin held talks in Qingdao, Shand\ong, on 9 August 2022. Wang Yi and Park Jin first held a small-group meeting lasting approximately one hour and forty minutes, followed by expanded talks. On 10 August 2022, Park Jin told China that South Korea’s "no new THAAD anti-missile system will be deployed", "no joining the US missile defense system", and "no seeking of a South Korea-US-Japan military alliance" were not commitments made by South Korea to China or agreements reached by the two sides.

On 10 August, after the talks, the Chinese Ministry of Foreign Affairs said that "China and South Korea have handled the THAAD issue in a phased and stable manner." Wang Wenbin, spokesperson for the Chinese Ministry of Foreign Affairs, said at the regular press conference that day that "the US deployment of the THAAD system in South Korea has obviously damaged China's strategic security interests, and China has expressed its concerns to South Korea on many occasions. The South Korean government has officially made a policy declaration of 'three no's and one restriction' to the outside world, and China attaches importance to this position of the South Korean government." When Park Jin introduced the results of his visit to China to a group of South Korean journalists in Qingdao, he said that he had made it clear to China that the so-called "three no's and one restriction" of THAAD was not a promise made by South Korea to China or an agreement reached by both sides. Later, because China publicized that South Korea had made a policy declaration of "three no's and one restriction", on 11 August, the South Korean Presidential Office reiterated the "three no's and one restriction" of the THAAD anti-missile system, saying that "three no's and one restriction" was not a promise made by South Korea, nor was it an agreement reached by South Korea and China. At the same time, South Korea publicly stated that the deployment of the US THAAD missile defense system was for self-defense, and that this would "never" become a negotiable issue. On 11 August, the South Korean presidential office announced that the environmental impact assessment of the THAAD base would be accelerated and that the normalization of the THAAD base was expected to be completed by the end of the month.

From 24 February to 24 March 2023, the draft environmental impact assessment report for the THAAD anti-missile base was publicized online and offline. On 11 May, the South Korean Ministry of National Defense submitted the environmental impact assessment report for the THAAD base to the Ministry of Environment of South Korea. On 21 June, the Ministry of Climate, Energy and Environment approved the environmental impact assessment report for the base.

=== 2026 withdrawal ===
On 28 February 2026, according to CNN, after the U.S.. and Israel coalition launched airstrikes against Iran, the THAAD missile defense system sites deployed by the United States in Jordan were attacked several times in the counterattack launched by Iran. Satellite images showed that a radar system deployed in an open site had been destroyed. Between 28 February and 1 March, at least three buildings at a military facility near Al Dhannah in the United Arab Emirates and four buildings at a military facility of Sadr were damaged. According to publicly available information, the vehicle sheds used to store the THAAD anti-missile radar system at both facilities were hit. The incident eventually forced the United States to withdraw part or all of the THAAD system from South Korea and transport it to the Middle East for support.

The action was widely covered in South Korean news and generated controversy, with President Lee Jae Myung publicly expressing his opposition to the American decision. Military commentator James Jseng pointed out that this policy move also has regional strategic signals, especially the pressure on South Korea. He believes that the relevant actions of U.S. President Donald Trump are, to some extent, "correcting" South Korea's policy orientation. Jseng said that South Korea has long adopted a relatively ambiguous position between the US and China, and its performance on the issue of defense cost sharing has not met the expectations of the US, and progress on tariff agreement negotiations has been slow. The US is using security and economic and trade means to exert pressure on South Korea in order to make South Korea understand that if it fails to cooperate more clearly in strategy and policy, the US may increase the corresponding policy costs. He further pointed out that this move is not only an adjustment of bilateral relations, but also reflects the overall layout of the U.S. in reshaping the responsibility sharing and strategic consistency of allies in the Indo-Pacific region.
