= Embassy of South Korea, Beijing =

Embassy of South Korea in Beijing Korean: 주 중화인민공화국 대한민국 대사관 Chinese: 韩国驻中国大使馆 Chinese: 韓國駐中國大使館
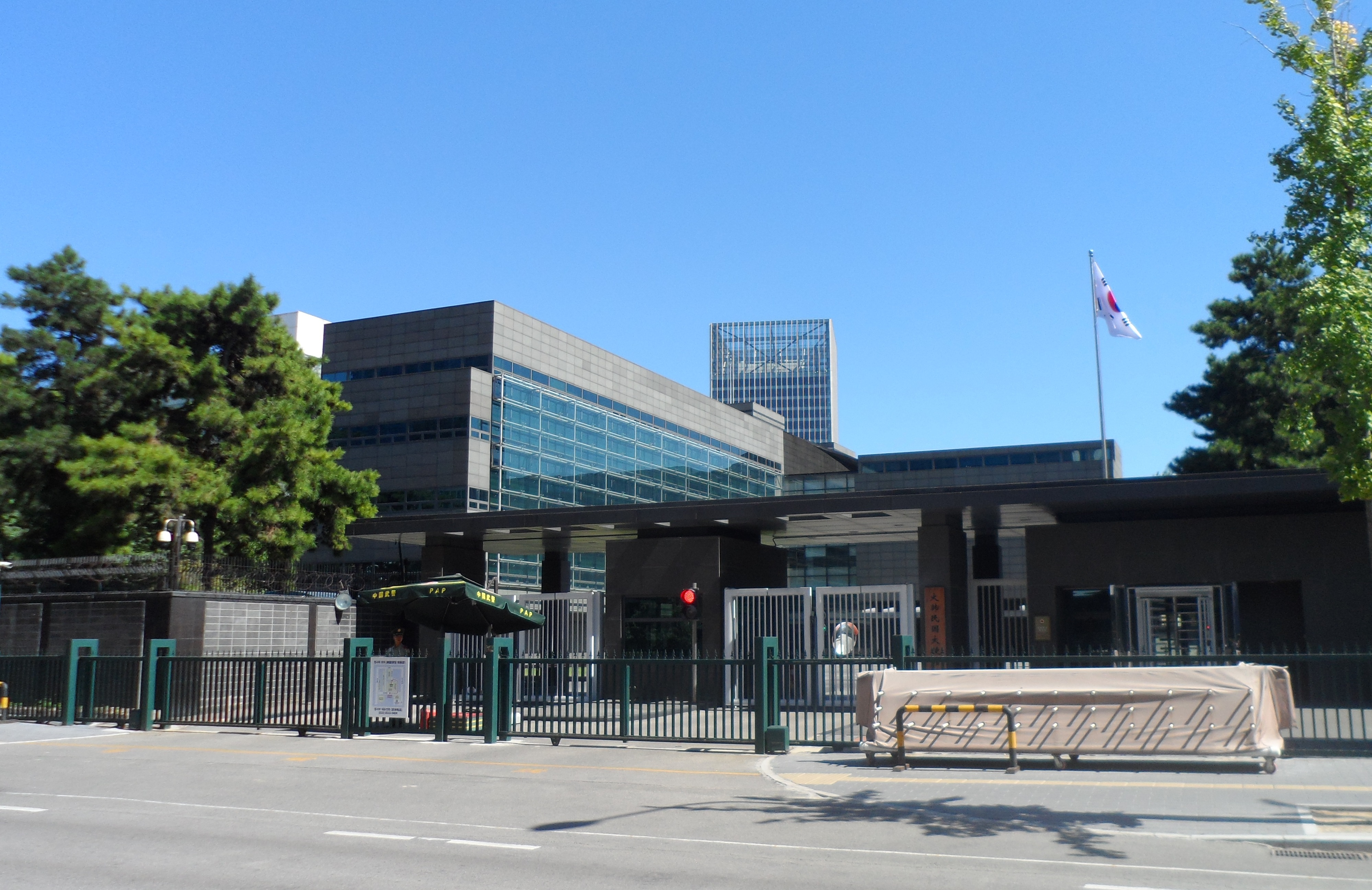
- Location: Beijing, China
- Address: 7 N. Liangmaqiao St., Chaoyang District, Beijing
- Coordinates: 39°57′21″N 116°27′54″E
- Ambassador: Jae-Ho Jeong
- Website: overseas.mofa.go.kr/cn-zh/index.do

The Embassy of South Korea in Beijing（Korean: 주 중화인민공화국 대한민국 대사관 ; simplified Chinese: 韩国驻中国大使馆; traditional Chinese: 韓國駐中國大使館）is the official diplomatic mission of the Republic of Korea in the People's Republic of China. The embassy was officially established in August 1992.

== Organization ==
The embassy consists of the following sections:

- Political Section
- Management Section
- Economic Affairs Section
- Public Affairs Section
- Consular Section
- Consulate General
  - Consulate General of South Korea, Hong Kong
  - Consulate General of the Republic of Korea in Shanghai
  - Consulate General of the Republic of Korea in Qingdao
  - Consulate General of the Republic of Korea in Guangzhou
  - Consulate General of the Republic of Korea in Shenyang
  - Consulate General of the Republic of Korea in Xi'an
  - Consulate General of the Republic of Korea in Wuhan

== Incident ==
=== Minister Hwang food poisoing accident (2007) ===
Minister Hwang Jeong-il was dead after he was treated in local Chinese hospital, Vista Medical Center. It was reported that Minister Hwang ate a tuna sandwich at the nearby convenient store and soon he felt a stomachache.

=== Marble slingshot accident (2011) ===
On December 13, 2011, it was reported that the embassy was attacked by someone with marbles. After investigations at the scene, it was revealed that the bulletproof glass was cracked with a metal ball discovered inside the building, which was likely due to the use of a slingshot.

== List of ambassadors ==
- Roh Jae-won
- Hwang Byeong-tae
- Jung jong wook
- Kwon Byeong-hyeon
- Hong Sun Young
- Kim Ha Jung
- Shin Jeong Seung
- Kwon Young-se
- Kim Jang-soo
- Roh Young min
- Jang Ha Seong
- Jeong Jae-ho
- Roh Jae-heon

== See also ==
- China–South Korea relations
- Embassy of China, Seoul
- List of diplomatic missions of South Korea
- List of diplomatic missions in China

== Gallery ==
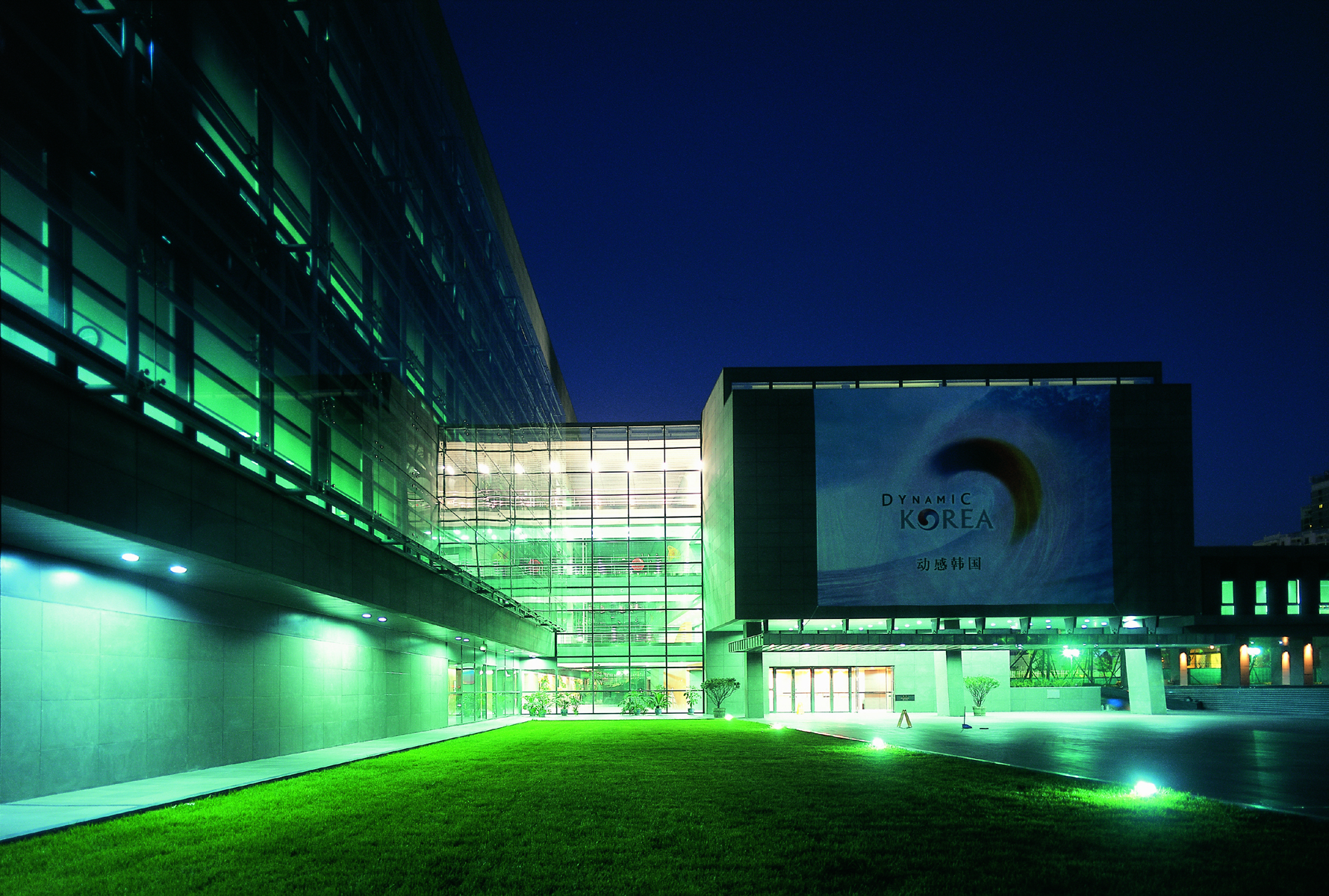
Korean Embassy at night
