= Chen Jian (diplomat) =

Chinese diplomat

- 陈健

Ambassador Extraordinary and Plenipotentiary of China to Japan
- In office February 1998 – April 2001
- Preceded by: Xu Dunxin
- Succeeded by: Wu Dawei

Ambassador and Deputy Permanent Representative, Permanent Mission of the PRC to the United Nations
- In office September 1992 – February 1994

Personal details
- Born: February 2, 1942 (age 84) Shanghai, China
- Party: Chinese Communist Party
- Education: Fudan University; Beijing Foreign Studies University

Chen Jian (born 2 February 1942) is a Chinese diplomat. He was the Under-Secretary-General for General Assembly and Conference Management of United Nations from 2001 to 2007.

== Early years ==
Chen was born in Suzhou in 1942. He graduated from Shanghai Sanlin High School and went to Fudan University. He then received his bachelor's degree in English from Fudan in 1964. He furthered her English Translation Study in Beijing Foreign Studies University from 1964 to 1966.

== Diplomat career ==
From 1966 to 1972, Chen worked as Staff member of the Department of International Organizations and Conferences of the Chinese Ministry of Foreign Affairs (MFA). 1972, he became attaché of the Permanent Mission of the People's Republic of China (PRC) to the United Nations until 1977. He was the first groups of diplomats represent PRC after United Nation recognizing PRC as "the only legitimate representative of China to the United Nations. Chen went back to China and continue working in the Department of International Organizations and Conferences. After three-year work in China, Chen went back to United Nation and served as Third Secretary, Second Secretary and then First Secretary of the Permanent Mission of the PRC to the United Nations. In 1984, Chen was appointed as Assistant of the executive director of International Monetary Fund. Chen was promoted as Division Chief, Counselor and then Deputy Director General of the Department of International Organizations and Conferences from 1985 to 1992. He was appointed as Ambassador and Deputy Permanent Representative of the PRC to the United Nations from 1992 to 1994.

He served Director General of the Information Department and spokesman of the MFA from 1994 t o1996, and Assistant Minister of Foreign Affairs from 1996 to 1998. April 1998, Chen appointed as Ambassador Extraordinary and Plenipotentiary of the PRC to Japan. On 21 August 2001, Secretary-General Kofi Annan appointed Chen as Under-Secretary-General for General Assembly Affairs and Conference Services.

From 2007 to 2012, Chen was the president of UN Association of China. He is currently the President of International Relation College of China Renmin University.
