= Ning Fukui =

Chinese politician

- 宁赋魁

Chinese Ambassador to Thailand
- In office August 2013 – August 2017
- Preceded by: Guan Mu
- Succeeded by: Lü Jian

Deputy Secretary-General of Yunnan
- In office 2011 – July 2013

Director of the Department of Boundary and Ocean Affairs of Foreign Affairs of the People's Republic of China
- In office 2009–2011
- Succeeded by: Deng Zhonghua

Chinese Ambassador to South Korea
- In office September 2005 – October 2008
- Preceded by: Li Bin
- Succeeded by: Cheng Yonghua

Chinese Ambassador for Korean Peninsula Affairs
- In office 2003–2005
- Preceded by: New title
- Succeeded by: Li Bin

Chinese Ambassador to Kampuchea
- In office April 2000 – November 2003
- Preceded by: Man Ting'ai
- Succeeded by: Hu Qianwen

Personal details
- Born: December 1955 (age 70) Qinghe County, Hebei, China
- Party: Chinese Communist Party
- Education: Kim Il-sung University

Ning Fukui (simplified Chinese: 宁赋魁; traditional Chinese: 寧賦魁; pinyin: Nìng Fùkuí; born December 1955) is a Chinese diplomat.

== Life and career ==
Ning was born in Qinghe County, Hebei, in December 1955. After graduating from Kim Il-sung University in 1977 he assigned to the Ministry of Foreign Affairs of the People's Republic of China.

He was deputy director of the Asian Affairs of the Ministry of Foreign Affairs of the People's Republic of China from 1955 to 2000.

In 2000 he was promoted to become the Chinese Ambassador to Cambodia, a position he held until 2003.

He was the Chinese Ambassador to South Korea in 2006, and held that office until 2008.

From 2009 to 2011 he served as director of the Department of Boundary and Ocean Affairs of Foreign Affairs of the People's Republic of China.

He became the Deputy Secretary-General of Yunnan in 2011, and served until July 2013.

In August 2013, the Chinese president Hu Jintao appointed Ning Fukui the Chinese Ambassador to Thailand.

Diplomatic posts
Preceded by Yan Ting'ai (晏廷爱)	Chinese Ambassador to Cambodia; 2000–2003	Succeeded by Hu Qianwen (胡乾文)
New title	Chinese Ambassador for Korean Peninsula Affairs; 2003–2005	Succeeded by Li Bin
Preceded by Li Bin (diplomat)	Chinese Ambassador to South Korea; 2006–2008	Succeeded by Cheng Yonghua
Preceded by Guan Mu	Chinese Ambassador to Thailand; 2013–2017	Succeeded by Lü Jian
Government offices
Preceded by ?	Director of the Department of Boundary and Ocean Affairs of Foreign Affairs of the People's Republic of China; 2009–2011	Succeeded by Deng Zhonghua (邓中华)
