= List of ambassadors of China to South Korea =

Ambassador of China to South Korea
- 주한 중국 대사
- National emblem of China

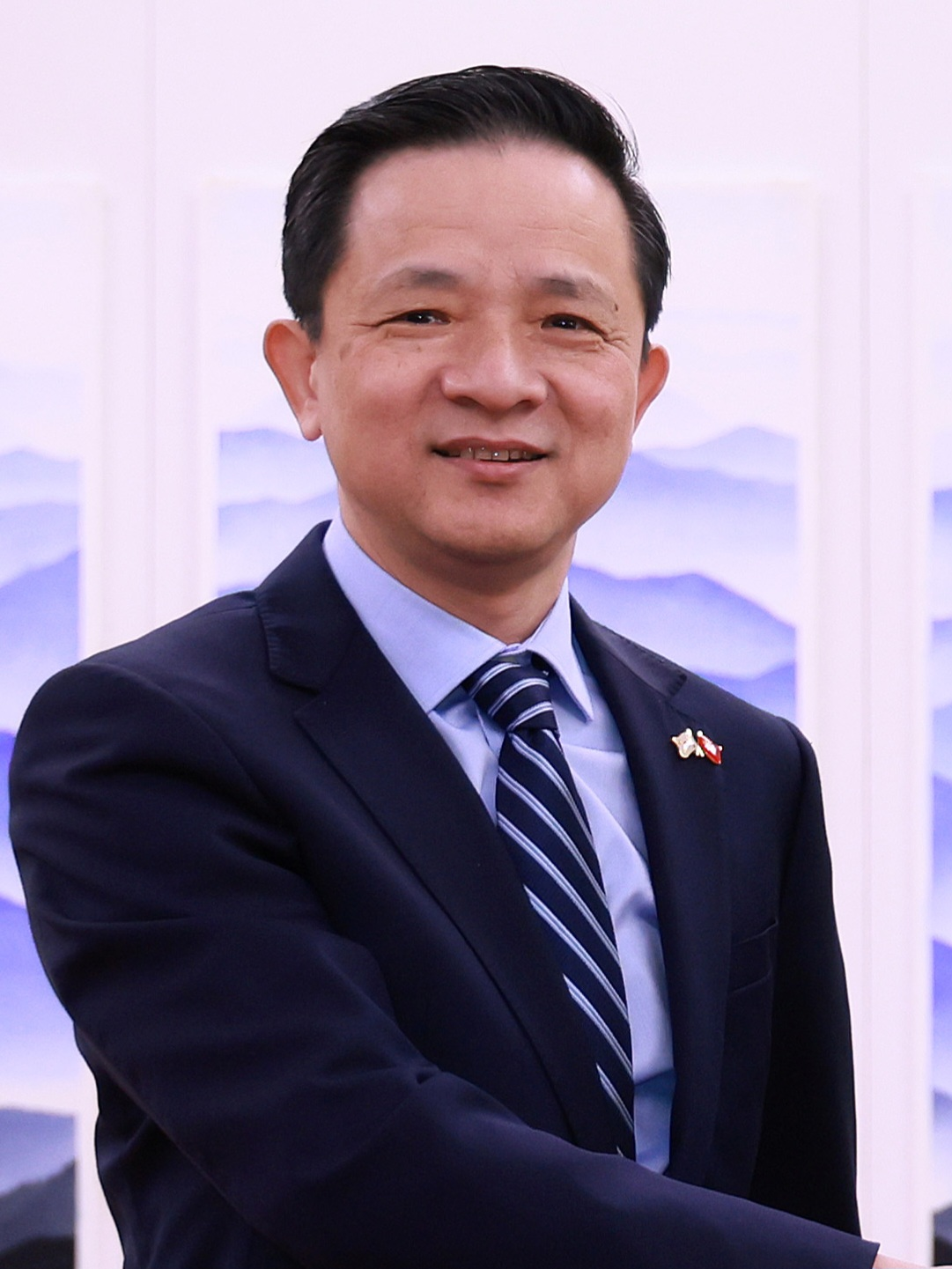
- Incumbent; Dai Bing since December 2024
- Inaugural holder: Zhang Tingyan
- Formation: August 1988; 38 years ago
- Website: http://kr.china-embassy.org

The ambassador of China to South Korea is the official representative of the People's Republic of China to the Republic of Korea.

Chinese-Korean diplomatic relations were well established before the Joseon period of Korean history. In 1882, the governments of the Kingdom of Great Joseon and in Beijing established diplomatic relations.

The current official title of the incumbent diplomat is Ambassador of the People's Republic of China to the Republic of Korea.

== List of representatives ==
=== Ministers of Imperial China ===
- Hsu Sou Peng was appointed December 14, 1899.
- Hsu Tai Shen was appointed November 12, 1901.

=== Ambassadors of the Republic of China ===
- From 1949 to 1988 the governments in Taipei/Nanjing and Seoul maintained diplomatic relations on ambassadorial level.

=== Ambassadors of the People's Republic of China ===
#	Ambassador	Took office	Left office	Notes
1	Zhang Tingyan	September 1992	August 1998	
2	Wu Dawei	September 1998	July 2001	
3	Li Bin	October 2001	August 2005	
4	Ning Fukui	September 2005	October 2008	
5	Cheng Yonghua	October 2008	February 2010	
6	Zhang Xinsen	March 2010	December 2013	
7	Qiu Guohong	February 2014	December 2019	
8	Xing Haiming	January 2020	July 2024	
9	Fang Kun	July 2024	December 2024	Charge d'affaires
10	Dai Bing	December 2024	Incumbent	

== See also ==
- China–Korea Treaty of 1882
- List of diplomatic missions in South Korea
