= Wu Dawei =

Chinese diplomat

- 武大伟
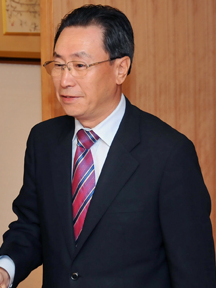

Chinese Ambassador to South Korea
- In office September 1998 – July 2001
- Preceded by: Zhang Tingyan
- Succeeded by: Li Bin

Chinese Ambassador to Japan
- In office July 2001 – August 2004
- Preceded by: Chen Jian
- Succeeded by: Wang Yi

Personal details
- Born: 1946 (age 79–80) Heilongjiang, China
- Party: Chinese Communist Party
- Education: Beijing Foreign Studies University
- Occupation: Diplomat

Wu Dawei
- Traditional Chinese: 武大偉
- Simplified Chinese: 武大伟
Transcriptions
Standard Mandarin
- Hanyu Pinyin: Wǔ Dàwěi

Wu Dawei (pronounced Mandarin: [u tAuei]; simplified Chinese: 武大伟; traditional Chinese: 武大偉; born 1946) was the previous special representative for Korean Peninsula Affairs and former Vice Minister of Foreign Affairs of the People's Republic of China.

== Personal life ==
Wu was born in 1946 in Heilongjiang province, China. He attended the Beijing Foreign Studies University before joining the Ministry of Foreign Affairs.

Wu is married and has one daughter.

== Career ==
Wu's career has largely taken him back and forth between China and Japan. His first assignment with the Ministry of Foreign Affairs was as an attaché to the Chinese embassy in Japan, lasting from 1973 to 1979.

He returned to China in 1979 to take a position in the Ministry Department of Asian Affairs, and in 1980 was promoted to deputy office director of the General Office. He returned to Japan again in 1985 to serve as second secretary and later first secretary in the Chinese embassy. In 1994, he was posted back to Japan as minister counselor.

Wu's first ambassadorial-level assignment was to South Korea in 1998.

Following his time in South Korea, Wu became China's ambassador to Japan in 2001. He returned to China to take up his post as Vice Minister of Foreign affairs at the end of that assignment.

In 2005, Wu acted as the chairman to the fourth round of six-party talks looking to bring a peaceful resolution to security concerns on the Korean Peninsula. He retained the position of chairman until the dissolution of the talks in 2007.

== Controversies ==
Controversies which arose during his tenure there include his 1999 remarks in which he condemned South Korean and non-governmental organization involvement with the issue of North Korean defectors in northeast China, deriding it as "neo-interventionism", and claimed that the safety of refugees repatriated to North Korea had been guaranteed. His comments spurred South Korean human rights activists to hold protests at the Chinese embassy in Seoul and circulate a petition urging the United Nations to grant refugee status to North Koreans in China.

Diplomatic posts
Previous: Zhang Tingyan	2nd Chinese Ambassador to South Korea; September 1998 – July 2001	Next: Li Bin
Previous: Chen Jian	Chinese Ambassador to Japan; July 2001 – August 2004	Next: Wang Yi
