= Feeling thermometer =

Visual analog scale used in survey research

A feeling thermometer, also known as a thermometer scale, is a type of visual analog scale that allows respondents to rank their views of a given subject on a scale from "cold" (indicating disapproval) to "hot" (indicating approval), analogous to the temperature scale of a real thermometer. It is often used in survey and political science research to measure how positively individuals feel about a given group, individual, issue, or organisation, as well as in quality of life research to measure individuals' subjective health status. It typically uses a rating scale with options ranging from a minimum of 0 to a maximum of 100. Questions using the feeling thermometer have been included in every year of the American National Election Studies since 1968.

Since its inclusion in a national forum, the tool has developed and become popular in both the political sphere and for medical and psychological research purposes. As it is a relatively new method of research and is still being studied and improved, the feeling thermometer is commonly criticised for its limits of accuracy and validity due to restricted research in certain fields. However, despite certain limitations, there is a great deal of experimentation and case studies using the feeling thermometer in both the medical and political spaces. Individuals' views can be easily gathered through this analogy scale, primarily to gauge an overall public opinion using the 'hot' and 'cold' temperature measurements. In addition, the feeling thermometer has a variety of applications in research to assist in understanding the burden of diseases and psychological states of people.

== History ==
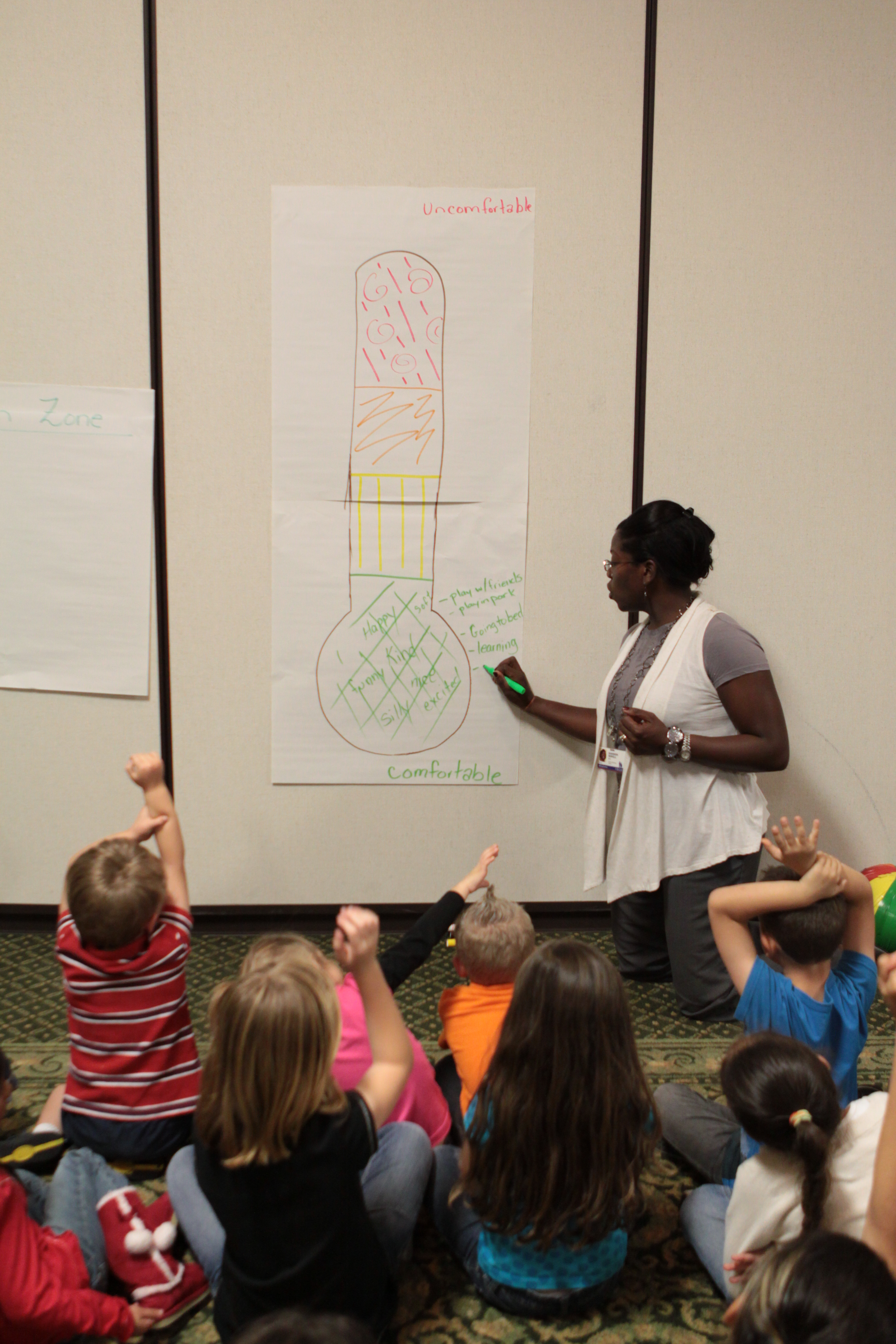
Using the feeling thermometer as a teaching resource in the classroom to simplify the identification of their feelings.

In 1921, Hayes and Patterson used the visual analog scale (VAS) method for the first time to measure and record the pain intensity of patients' medical issues. Throughout the mid-1900s, different types of visual analog scales were developed such as the traditional, graphic and numeric rating scales that all use a continuous line of measurement to gather an outcome. The feeling thermometer is a numeric rating scale as the users of it are asked to express their emotions and feelings using numbers, from 0 to 100. This explains the name of the methodology which refers to the temperatures on the thermometer to gather a calculation. The system uses higher numbers and warmth to reflect positivity in contrast to colder degrees to express any negative feelings.

The American National Election Studies (ANES) was the first wide-scale forum that implemented the feeling thermometer measurement. From its first inclusion in 1964, "feeling thermometer scales have been quite popular to measure attitudes towards politicians, groups, and public figures," thereby allowing for an expansion of the tool to reach wider audiences. Throughout the survey, participants are asked a variety of questions that aim to determine public opinions about political partisans. The questions asked aimed to remain neutral and unbiased, as with all feeling thermometers, only providing a statement and explaining how participants can rate it. An extract of a survey question from the 1996 American National Election Study (ANES) is as follows;

"In the list that follows, rate that person/party using something we call the feeling thermometer. Ratings between 50 degrees and 100 degrees mean that you feel favourable and warm toward the person/party. Ratings between 0 and 50 degrees mean that you don't feel favourable toward the person/party and that you don't care too much for that person. You would rate the person at the 50-degree mark if you don't feel particularly warm or cold toward the person."

The reliability of the ANES feeling thermometer in 1970 was tested by Alwin (2007) to reveal that "it spans in quite a large range". However, as the accuracy has developed, the scale has become a highly popular means to determine the feelings toward political leaders, issues and ideologies. Studies are regularly conducted about the accuracy of the feelings thermometer and expanding the possible uses beyond the common fields of research. This progression has led to more recent accounts, from early 2021 to 2022, documenting the use of the feeling thermometer in gathering respondents' subjective thoughts towards vaccinated and unvaccinated people during the COVID-19 pandemic. Additionally, the pandemic saw an increase in studies of attitudes against minorities or beliefs of racism, such as xenophobia against Asian populations. These served an importance for governments and leaders to identify the basis of the problem, what is causing misinformed attitudes, paving way for potential solutions to the problem.

== Applications in research ==
Amidst its popularity in political research, the feeling thermometer has also assisted in both psychological and sociological research as well as in the medical field. Research has been conducted to identify individuals' feelings towards different social groups and societal issues such as quality of life, economics and environmental issues. Additionally, case studies have been carried out to identify the burden of various diseases and the extent of pain an individual may be in, due to their medical condition or illness.

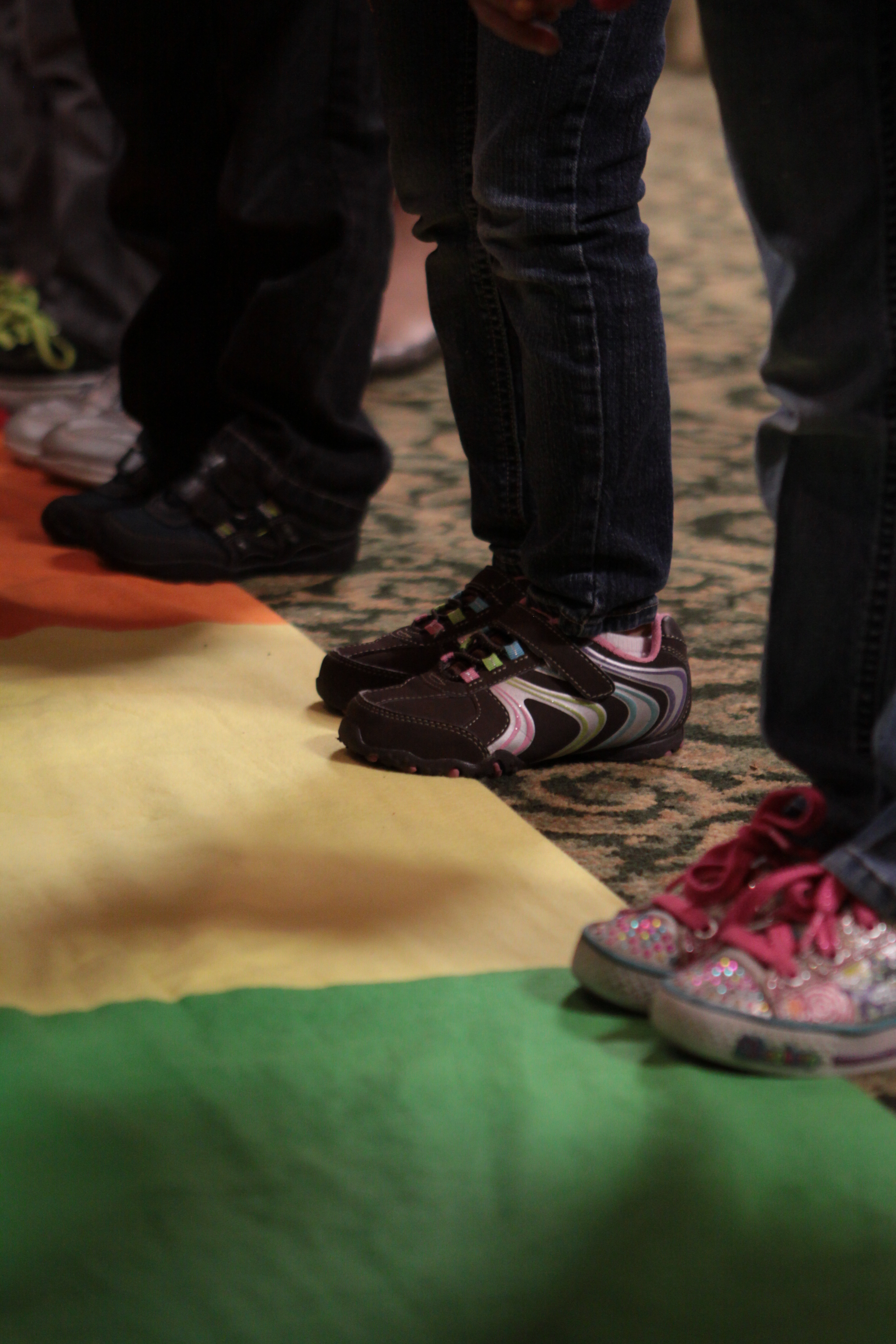
Children using an interactive feeling thermometer to help identify and communicate their emotions.

As the feeling thermometer can be used to measure the effect of diseases on populations, it is often incorporated into research, for example, in conjunction with the Crohn's Disease Activity Index. In this study about the effects of Crohn's Disease, patients conducted a questionnaire containing the feeling thermometer to report their health and the burden of both the disease and its specific treatment. The feeling thermometer was effective in measuring their health outcomes and provided "a quick and accurate assessment of the burden of Crohn's disease on patients"[3] which supported the other research tools used and identified common issues.

As proven in the American National Election Surveys, feeling thermometers have also been a beneficial tool as a longitudinal study measure to estimate population changes over time. Its ability to analyse and represent large groups of data efficiently allows for the tool to be used on a wide-scale such as for international collection of data as explored in Use in the political sphere.

A variation of the feeling thermometer has also become highly popular amongst psychologists and behavioural therapists to explore emotions of clients and help identify them. The same concept of connecting a particular area of the scale to a feeling is used, although, to simplify the identification process, colours replace the numbers. Thus, 0 degrees is represented with light green or blue to signify cold, unfavourable feelings such as apathy and 100 degrees depicting happy, warm emotions. However, this model varies between thermometers depending on what outcome the behavioural therapist is seeking to achieve. For cognitive behavioural therapists, clients can be asked to create their own feeling thermometers to "recognise emotions in self and others, regulate and manage strong emotions (positive and negative), and recognising strengths and areas of need." Allowing individuals to express their emotions using their own methodologies helps the results to be more accurate and is also an effective classroom learning strategy. Thus, teachers have incorporated this tool to help students communicate their emotions without the pressure of talking and trying to recognise their feelings.

== Limitations and criticisms ==
As with many visual analog scales, the feeling thermometer has been criticised for its limits of accuracy, precision, range and reliability. The process of using the measurement allows for a high level of bias from participants when answering questions and in turn providing their ratings. The instructions provided state that "ratings between 50 and 100 degrees mean that you feel favourable and warm towards the person (group)" and the opposite feeling goes for ratings between 0 and 50 degrees. Arguably, these directions can be interpreted in different ways by various individuals depending on their knowledge of the political topic being questioned, therefore limiting the ability to compare scores between people. As suggested by Brady (1985), "feeling thermometer scores may be plagued by problems of interpersonal incompatibility" which presents the difficulties that come with making decisive decisions about personal matters.

Another commonly researched limitation of the feeling thermometer is the difficulty for respondents in making precise distinctions between the measurement points to reflect their accurate feelings. People's opinions can change quickly based on a large range of factors such as the time of performing the test, their mood and exterior influences such as people. "People are not capable psychologically of making such fine distinctions of their own internal dispositions" and individuals may have difficulty expressing their exact emotions, especially when in a medical review to rate their pain or discomfort.

In psychology, Affect is defined as "any experience, feeling or emotion...from the simplest to the most complex sensations of feeling" described as positive or negative which can be consistent with the feeling thermometers role in collecting individuals' responses to stimuli. This definition holds importance in relation to criticisms of the feeling thermometer from Abelson and Marcus (1988) who state that ratings "are not themselves affective responses." They suggest the model is bipolar and two-dimensional and unaccepting of the fact that feelings are complex and will not always be on a certain side of the spectrum, rather being flexible and often changing. Multiple researchers have discovered that "people can simultaneously experience positive and negative affect toward the same object and that these experiences had distinctive effects" limiting the feeling thermometer's ability to collect accurate data.

== Use in the political sphere ==
ANES feeling thermometer results 1980 through 2016 demonstrating affective polarisation

Since the first inclusion of the feeling thermometer in the American National Election Study (ANES), the feeling thermometer has become a popular tool to gather political opinions. Its use in the political sphere has been on both a national and international scale to identify the attitudes and values of political leaders and their countries. The American National Election Studies, voters from the whole of the United States are surveyed by through academic research question, directly before and after presidential elections. Since 2016, a similar approach is taken before and after political debates to determine whether or not they are a factor in the increase of political polarisation. A study after the 2016 general election debates, a study was conducted to examine the role of emotion on people's attitudes and responses to candidates. Prior to the debate, a series of questions were asked about attitudes towards the presidential candidates at the time, Hillary Clinton and Donald Trump, issues they discussed in addition to demographic questions. The feeling thermometer was used to analyse any changes that had occurred, calculating the difference between subjects' scores which ranged from 0-100 "(with 100 indicating the most favourable feelings toward the candidate)".

A 2014 YouGov dataset containing the countries of France, Germany, the United States of America and the United Kingdom were compared in an attempt to explain "why democracies go to war more often with non-democracies than with democracies". In using the feeling thermometer to measure populations' feelings towards foreign countries, it was gathered that power was the main component that influenced a relationship between democratic countries and a divide between foreign states. Feeling thermometer data also helps identify significant polarisation as the scale easily differentiates "colder" and "warmer" feelings towards both parties and leaders.

To gain specific responses from the survey tool, well-tested equations and questions have been developed to gain specific outcomes that can assist in research and predictions of future political forums. The presidential and congressional feeling thermometer equation are examples of popular political calculators that assist in deciphering between public responses. Trust in democracy and the political system began becoming a common point of topic in the early 2000s leading to improvement of such formulations to measure individual's satisfaction (or dissatisfaction) with political leaders. Since the president is "the focal point of the political system" in the United States of America, analysis of people's specific feelings towards their overall leader is vital in understanding the general consensus. Additionally, the consistent use as a longitudinal study method, for example, in collecting ratings of presidential candidates "before and immediately after six elections (1972, 1980, 1984, 1988, 1992, 1996)," allow for detailed analysis and comparisons in society. Thus, the presidential feeling thermometer is a beneficial tool in the political sphere.
