= Zhang Xinsen =

Chinese diplomat

- 张鑫森

6th Chinese Ambassador to South Korea
- In office March 2010 – December 2013
- Preceded by: Cheng Yonghua
- Succeeded by: Qiu Guohong

Director of the Office of the Chinese Foreign Ministry
- In office September 2007 – March 2010
- Succeeded by: Zhang Ming

Chinese Ambassador to Ireland
- In office November 2005 – September 2007
- Preceded by: Sha Hailin
- Succeeded by: Liu Biwei

Personal details
- Born: July 1953 (age 73) Shanghai, China
- Party: Chinese Communist Party
- Education: Beijing Foreign Studies University; Chinese Academy of Governance; John F. Kennedy School of Government

Zhang Xinsen (simplified Chinese: 张鑫森; traditional Chinese: 張鑫森; pinyin: Zhāng Xīnsēn; born July 1953) is a Chinese diplomat and formerly the Chinese Ambassador to South Korea.

== Life and career ==
Zhang was born in Shanghai, in July 1953. He graduated from Beijing Foreign Studies University. He also studied at Chinese Academy of Governance and John F. Kennedy School of Government as a part-time student.

In November 2005 he was promoted to become the Chinese Ambassador to Ireland, a position he held until September 2007.

In September 2007, he was appointed the director of the Office of the Chinese Foreign Ministry, he remained in that position until March 2010, when he was transferred to Seoul, capital of South Korea, and appointed the Chinese Ambassador.

Diplomatic posts
Preceded by Sha Hailin	Chinese Ambassador to Ireland; 2005–2007	Succeeded by Liu Biwei
Preceded by Cheng Yonghua	6th Chinese Ambassador to South Korea; 2010–2013	Succeeded by Qiu Guohong
Government offices
Preceded by ?	Director of the Office of the Chinese Foreign Ministry; 2007–2010	Succeeded by Zhang Ming (张明)
