= Xing Haiming =

Chinese diplomat

- 邢海明
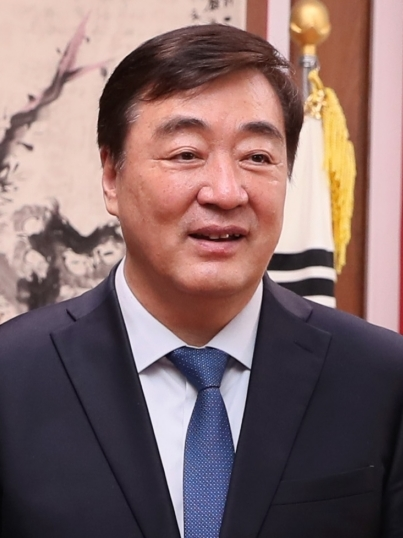
- Xing in February 2020

Chinese Ambassador to South Korea
- In office January 2020 – July 2024
- Preceded by: Qiu Guohong
- Succeeded by: Fang Kun

Chinese Ambassador to Mongolia
- In office August 2015 – December 2019
- Preceded by: Wang Xiaolong
- Succeeded by: Chai Wenrui

Personal details
- Born: November 1964 (age 61) Tianjin, China
- Party: Chinese Communist Party
- Spouse: Tan Yujun
- Education: Sariwon Agricultural University (Now known as Kye Ung Sang University)

Xing Haiming (Chinese: 邢海明; pinyin: Xíng Hǎimíng; born November 1964) is a Chinese diplomat currently serving as Chinese ambassador to South Korea.

== Biography ==
Born in November 1964, he graduated from Sariwon Agricultural University in the 1980s. He joined the Department of Asia, Ministry of Foreign Affairs in 1986. He served as attaché in North Korea brief 1988–1991 tenure. In 1992, he became a third secretary in the Chinese Embassy in South Korea. He returned to the Department of Asia, Ministry of Foreign Affairs in 1995. He was Chinese counsellor to South Korea from 2003 to 2006, Chinese counsellor to North Korea from 2006 and 2008, and again Chinese counsellor to South Korea from 2008 to 2011. In 2011, he was promoted to deputy director of the Department of Asia, Ministry of Foreign Affairs, and he held this post until 2015. He served as the Chinese Ambassador to Mongolia from August 2015 until December 2019, when he was succeeded by Chai Wenrui. President Xi Jinping appointed him Chinese ambassador to South Korea according to the decision of the Standing Committee of the National People's Congress in January 2020.

Diplomatic posts
Preceded by Wang Xiaolong	Chinese Ambassador to Mongolia; 2015–2019	Succeeded by Chai Wenrui
Preceded by Qiu Guohong	Chinese Ambassador to South Korea; 2020–2024	Succeeded by Fang Kun
