= Cheng Yonghua =

Chinese diplomat

- 程永华
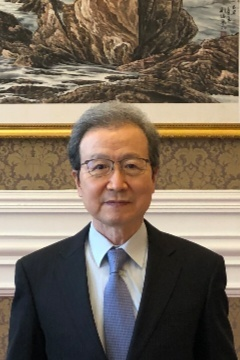

Chinese Ambassador to Japan
- In office February 28, 2010 – May 2019
- Preceded by: Cui Tiankai
- Succeeded by: Kong Xuanyou

Chinese Ambassador to South Korea
- In office October 2008 – January 2010
- Preceded by: Ning Fukui
- Succeeded by: Zhang Xinsen

Chinese Ambassador to Malaysia
- In office August 2006 – August 2008
- Preceded by: Wang Chungui
- Succeeded by: Liu Jian

Personal details
- Born: September 1954 (age 71–72) Changchun, Jilin, China
- Party: Chinese Communist Party
- Children: 1
- Education: Wako University; Sōka University

Chinese name
- Traditional Chinese: 程永華
- Simplified Chinese: 程永华
Transcriptions
Standard Mandarin
- Hanyu Pinyin: Chéng Yǒnghuá

Cheng Yonghua (Chinese: 程永华; born September 1954) is a Chinese diplomat who served as Ambassador to Japan from 2010 to 2019.

== Life and career ==
Cheng was born in Changchun, Jilin in September 1954.

Beginning in 1977, he served in several posts in the Chinese Embassy in Japan, including secretary, director, and counsellor. On February 28, 2010, the Chinese president Hu Jintao appointed Cheng the Chinese Ambassador to Japan, succeeding Cui Tiankai.

Cheng was the Chinese Ambassador to Malaysia from 2006 to 2008, and the Chinese Ambassador to South Korea between October 2008 to January 2010.

Diplomatic posts
Preceded by Wang Chungui	Chinese Ambassador to Malaysia; 2006–2008	Succeeded by Liu Jian
Preceded by Ning Fukui	Chinese Ambassador to South Korea; 2008–2010	Succeeded by Zhang Xinsen
Preceded by Cui Tiankai	Chinese Ambassador to Japan; 2010–2019	Succeeded by Kong Xuanyou
