= Zhang Tingyan =

Chinese diplomat

- 张庭延

1st Chinese Ambassador to South Korea
- In office 1992–1998
- Preceded by: New title
- Succeeded by: Wu Dawei

Personal details
- Born: February 1936 (age 90) Beijing, Republic of China
- Party: Chinese Communist Party
- Education: Peking University

Zhang Tingyan (simplified Chinese: 张庭延; traditional Chinese: 張庭延; pinyin: Zhāng Tíngyán; born February 1936) is a Chinese diplomat and the first Chinese Ambassador to South Korea.

== Life and career ==
Zhang was born in Beijing, in February 1936, during the Republic of China.

In 1954 he was accepted to Peking University and graduated in 1958. After graduation, he was assigned to the Ministry of Foreign Affairs of the People's Republic of China.

In 1963 he became a staff member in the Chinese Embassy in North Korea, he worked there until 1969. From 1969 to 1976, he was a section member in the Asian Affairs of the Ministry of Foreign Affairs of the People's Republic of China, and he was promoted to become its deputy director in 1989. In 1976, he was transferred to Pyongyang and appointed a secretary.

He was Chinese Counsellor to North Korea in 1986, and held that office until 1989.

In 1992, he was appointed the Chinese Ambassador to South Korea, and served until 1998.

Diplomatic posts
New title	1st Chinese Ambassador to South Korea; 1992–1998	Succeeded by Wu Dawei
