= Li Bin (diplomat) =

Chinese diplomat

- 李滨

Chinese Ambassador to South Korea
- In office October 2001 – August 2005
- Preceded by: Wu Dawei
- Succeeded by: Ning Fukui

Chinese Ambassador for Korean Peninsula Affairs
- In office 2005–2006
- Preceded by: Ning Fukui
- Succeeded by: Chen Naiqing

Personal details
- Born: July 1956 (age 70) Beijing, China
- Party: Chinese Communist Party
- Education: Kim Il-sung University

Li Bin (simplified Chinese: 李滨; traditional Chinese: 李濱; pinyin: Lǐ Bīn; born July 1956) is a former Chinese diplomat. He previously served as the Chinese Ambassador to South Korea, during his term of that office, he gave information to the Government of South Korea, he was placed under investigation by the National Security Commission of the Chinese Communist Party in December 2006.

== Life and career ==
Li was born in Beijing in July 1956.

After graduating from Kim Il-sung University in 1977 he assigned to the Chinese Embassy in North Korea.

In 1994 he was promoted to become the Chinese Counsellor to South Korea, a position he held until 1997. Then he was Chinese Minister-Counsellor to North Korea. After this office was terminated in October 2001, he became the Chinese Ambassador to South Korea, serving until August 2005.

He was deputy director of the Asian Affairs of the Ministry of Foreign Affairs of the People's Republic of China in August 2005, and held that office until June 2006.

In June 2006, he was appointed the deputy mayor of Weihai. He remained in that position until December 2006.

== Allegations of espionage ==
In 2006, Chinese officials took Li into custody for allegations of corruption. Soon after his arrest however, authorities began to allege that he had leaked state secrets to South Korean media outlets. Through a series of interrogations, Chinese authorities began to broaden their claims to say that Li had leaked state secrets to officials in the United States and South Korea.

One South Korean journalist that was suspected to have profited off the leaks, Park Ki-sung, published a blog post that Li had not been his source.

In 2007, Li was "lightly sentenced" to seven to eight years in prison on economic charges.

Diplomatic posts
Preceded by Ning Fukui	Chinese Ambassador for Korean Peninsula Affairs; 2005–2006	Succeeded by Chen Naiqing
Preceded by Wu Dawei	Chinese Ambassador to South Korea; 2001–2005	Succeeded by Ning Fukui
