= Hallyu ban =

China's bans of South Korean cultural products

The "Hallyu ban" is a series of policy restrictions imposed by China on the South Korean cultural products after the tensions between the two countries in 2016 due to the deployment of the Terminal High Altitude Area Defense (THAAD) anti-missile system by South Korea. It includes restricting South Korean artists from holding concerts in China, restricting the broadcast of South Korean TV dramas, forcibly stopping the private performing arts cooperation between the two countries, prohibiting the two countries from cooperating in the field of variety shows, and preventing South Korean private cultural industry companies from investing in China. However, the Chinese authorities denied that they had ever implemented the "Hallyu ban" and said that they had always maintained a positive attitude towards cultural exchanges between the two countries. China believes that cultural exchanges should be based on "public opinion" and claims that the deployment of THAAD (anti-missile system) has also aroused dissatisfaction among the Chinese public, and therefore will show anti-South Korean sentiment.

== Impact ==
In July 2016, rumors began to circulate about a "ban on Korean entertainment," which was triggered by media reports that Korean stars' performances were not approved after September. At the same time, Weibo blogger "Weishi Observer" posted a screenshot of what appeared to be an internal notice from Jiangsu Satellite TV prohibiting the broadcast of any advertisements featuring Korean stars. Hwang Chi-yeul's performance on October 29 was the last performance by a Korean singer in China in 2016.

In the Korean variety shows that were co-produced by China and South Korea or introduced by China, China originally paid copyright fees, but under the ban on Korean entertainment, China no longer pays copyright fees, including shows such as Running Man and I Am a Singer.

== Further developments ==
In February 2021, China Central Television and Korean Broadcasting System signed a cooperation agreement, which was regarded as the official lifting of the "Hallyu ban". At the same time, the movie I Love Catman, starring Korean star Sehun, was originally scheduled to be released in Chinese theaters on March 14, but was forced to be withdrawn due to strong resistance from anti-Korean netizens in China. However, in September of the same year, China launched a series of actions to rectify the entertainment industry. Even some Korean artists' fan groups were punished by the authorities, with Weibo accounts were banned. Some Korean media strongly criticized this, describing it as seriously affecting cultural exchanges between China and South Korea, and it was simply a second "Hallyu ban". Korean stars' Weibo accounts were not unbanned until December of the same year.

On 3 December 2021, with the release of the South Korean film Oh! Moon-hee in mainland Chinese cinemas and the resumption of Korean dramas on video websites such as Tencent Video and Bilibili, the ban on Korean content was partially lifted after 6 years. In November 2022, the South Korean film Hotel by the River was released on Tencent Video, which was seen by the outside world as a relaxation of the ban on Korean content. On November 23, Chinese Foreign Ministry spokesperson Zhao Lijian said at a regular press conference that since 2021, China has imported and broadcast many South Korean films and TV series.

In May 2023, Korean star Choo Ja-hyun participated in "Sisters Who Make Waves 2023", becoming the first Korean artist to appear on a mainland Chinese program since the ban on Korean entertainment. This was interpreted by some netizens as a further relaxation of the ban on Korean entertainment. Later, Korean stars Jung Yong-hwa and Hyuna were originally scheduled to participate in mainland Chinese variety shows and music festivals, but they were once again strongly condemned and boycotted by anti-Korean netizens and temporarily canceled their participation plans.

In February 2025, South Korean media quoted an official from the APEC summit organizing committee in China as saying that China might lift the ban on Korean entertainment as early as May. This was also because China considered that Lee Jae Myung might win the presidential election in 2025 and become the next president of South Korea. In March of the same year, the American film Number 17 directed by South Korean director Bong Joon-ho was released in China. Bong Joon-ho's name and related information were not blocked or deleted, indicating that non-Korean films directed by South Korean directors are not restricted. In April, the South Korean (non-foreign Korean) rap group Homies successfully held a performance in Wuhan. During the performance, they were not disturbed by anti-Korean forces. On 1 November 2025, during the APEC summit in Gyeongju, South Korea, Chinese President Xi Jinping and South Korean President Lee Jae Myung held a formal meeting. On the same day, the US-South Korea co-production film Past Lives was officially announced to be imported into mainland China. The official announcement of the film's import may be related to the positive signals conveyed by the APEC China-South Korea leaders' meeting.
