= Qiu Guohong =

Chinese politician

- 邱国洪

7th Chinese Ambassador to South Korea
- In office January 2014 – 7 February 2020
- Preceded by: Zhang Xinsen
- Succeeded by: Xing Haiming

17th Chinese Ambassador to Nepal
- In office November 2008 – April 2011
- Preceded by: Zheng Xianglin
- Succeeded by: Yang Houlan

Personal details
- Born: December 1957 (age 68) Shanghai, China
- Party: Chinese Communist Party
- Education: Shanghai International Studies University

Qiu Guohong (simplified Chinese: 邱国洪; traditional Chinese: 邱國洪; pinyin: Qiū Guóhóng; born December 1957) is a Chinese diplomat who served as the Chinese Ambassador to South Korea from 2014 to 2020 and Chinese Ambassador to Nepal from 2008 to 2011.

== Life and career ==
Qiu was born and raised in Shanghai. After graduating from Shanghai International Studies University he was assigned to the Ministry of Foreign Affairs of the People's Republic of China.

He spent 20 years working in the Chinese Embassy in Japan before serving as deputy director of the Asian Affairs of the Ministry of Foreign Affairs of the People's Republic of China.

In November 2008 he was promoted to become the Chinese Ambassador to Nepal, a position he held until April 2011.

He was director of Security Affairs of the Ministry of Foreign Affairs of the People's Republic of China in April 2011, and held that office until January 2014.

In January 2014, he was appointed the Chinese Ambassador to South Korea by 12th Standing Committee of the National People's Congress, succeeding Zhang Xinsen. His assignment in South Korea ended in 2020.

Diplomatic posts
Preceded by Zheng Xianglin (郑祥林)	17th Chinese Ambassador to Nepal; 2008–2011	Succeeded by Yang Houlan
Preceded by Zhang Xinsen	7th Chinese Ambassador to South Korea; 2014–2020	Succeeded by Xing Haiming
