= 2010 Senkaku boat collision incident =

Diplomatic dispute between Japan and China

External audio
- "Rare Earths: The Hidden Cost to Their Magic", Distillations Podcast and transcript, Episode 242, June 25, 2019, Science History Institute

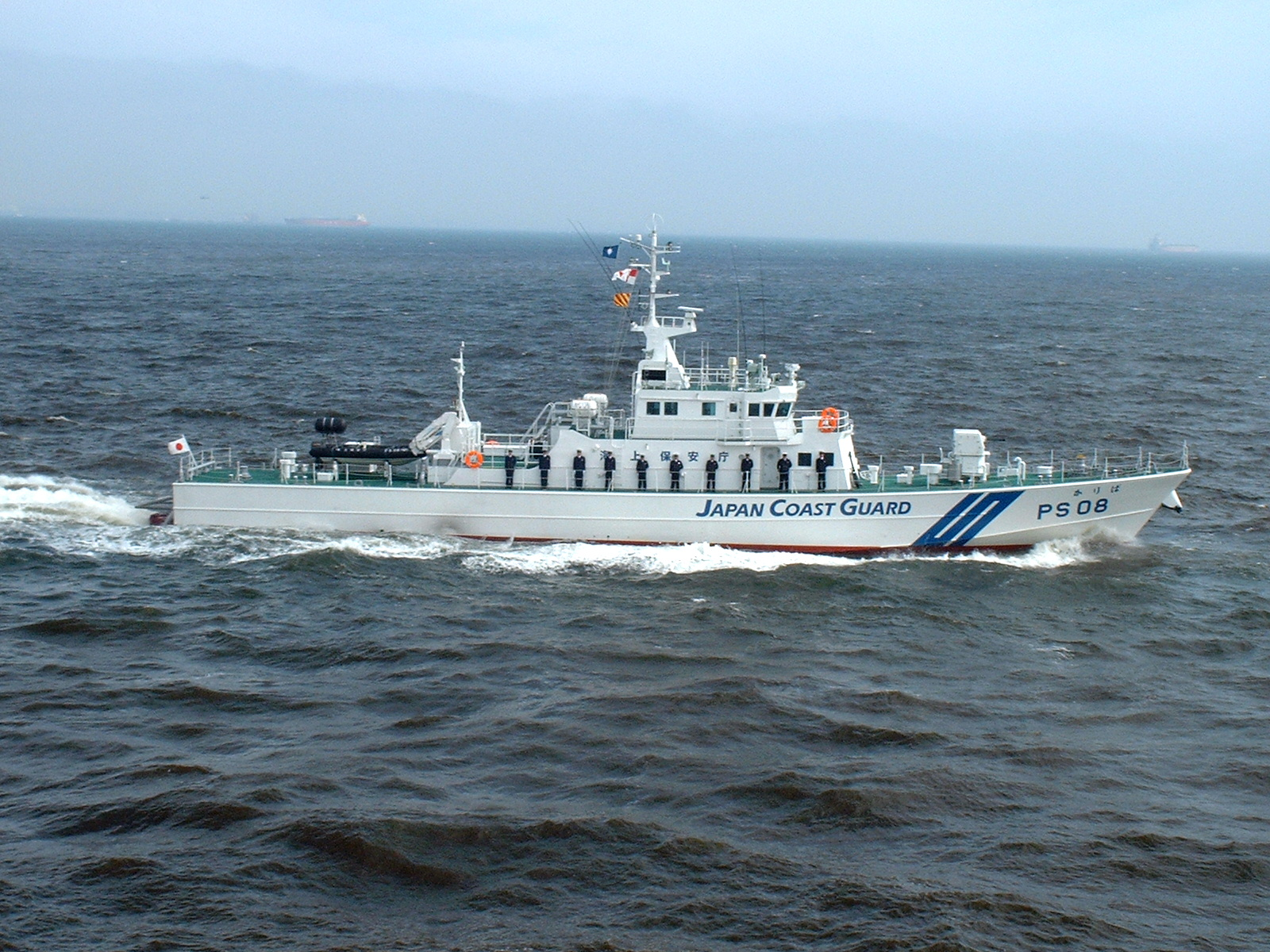
JCG PS Bizan-class patrol boat similar to Mizuki which collided with Minjinyu 5179

The gas fields near the disputed border of EEZ as claimed by Japan (Japan-China Median Line) and claimed by China (Okinawa Trough near the Diaoyu Islands) are related to this conflict.

The 2010 Senkaku boat collision incident (or the Minjinyu 5179 incident) occurred on the morning of September 7, 2010, when a Chinese trawler (Minjinyu 5179) operating in disputed waters collided with Japanese Coast Guard (JCG) patrol boats near the Senkaku Islands. There were several JCG boats involved, including Yonakuni and Mizuki, which collided with Minjinyu 5179, plus Hateruma and other JCG boats.

The collision and Japan's subsequent detention of the skipper, Zhan Qixiong (Chinese: 詹其雄), resulted in a major diplomatic dispute between China and Japan. When China's repeated demands for the release of the skipper were refused and his detention extended for ten more days, the Chinese government cancelled official meetings of the ministerial level and above.

The detained Chinese crew members were released without charge and were allowed to return home. In China the overall event is perceived as a diplomatic victory, while in Japan the Japanese government's "weak-kneed" handling of the issue was criticized, particularly by former Prime Minister Shinzo Abe.

== Background ==
The Senkaku Islands are claimed by Japan, the People's Republic of China and the Republic of China. In 2008 a sports fishing boat from Taiwan, Lien Ho, was rammed and sunk by JCG patrol ships which led to an official apology and monetary compensation of NT$10 million paid by Japan. Multiple events involving JCG and fishing boats from nearby Chinese provinces and Taiwan have occurred since 1972.

From 2005 to the 2010 incident, bilateral relations between China and Japan had been trending positively.

== Details of the incident ==
According to the JCG, the patrol boat Mizuki of the 11th Regional Coast Guard Headquarters encountered Minjinyu 5179 at about 10:15 (JST) on September 7, 2010. Mizuki ordered Minjinyu 5179 to stop for inspection since Minjinyu 5179 was traveling 12 km (7.5 mi) north-west of the Senkaku Islands, which is outside the agreed area for Chinese fishing, and within disputed Japanese territorial waters. Minjinyu 5179 refused the order and attempted to flee from the scene. During the chase and interception, Minjinyu 5179 collided with JCG patrol vessels. On September 8, 2010, JCG boarded the Chinese trawler and arrested its captain for obstruction of performance of public duty and illegal fishing. The trawler, the captain, and 14 crew members, were transported to Ishigaki Island of Japan for detention. An investigator told the press that he smelled alcohol on the arrested captain but apparently no alcohol test results were ever released.

In response to the arrest, the Chinese government made a series of diplomatic protests, demanding the immediate release of the trawler and all its crew. China summoned Uichiro Niwa, the Japanese ambassador to China in Beijing, six times, each time with an official of higher diplomatic rank, on one occasion after midnight. The trawler and 14 of the crew members (but not the captain, Zhan) were released after the sixth summons on September 13, 2010. The captain of the trawler remained in Japanese detention for 17 days and was finally released on September 24, 2010.

== Chronology of events ==
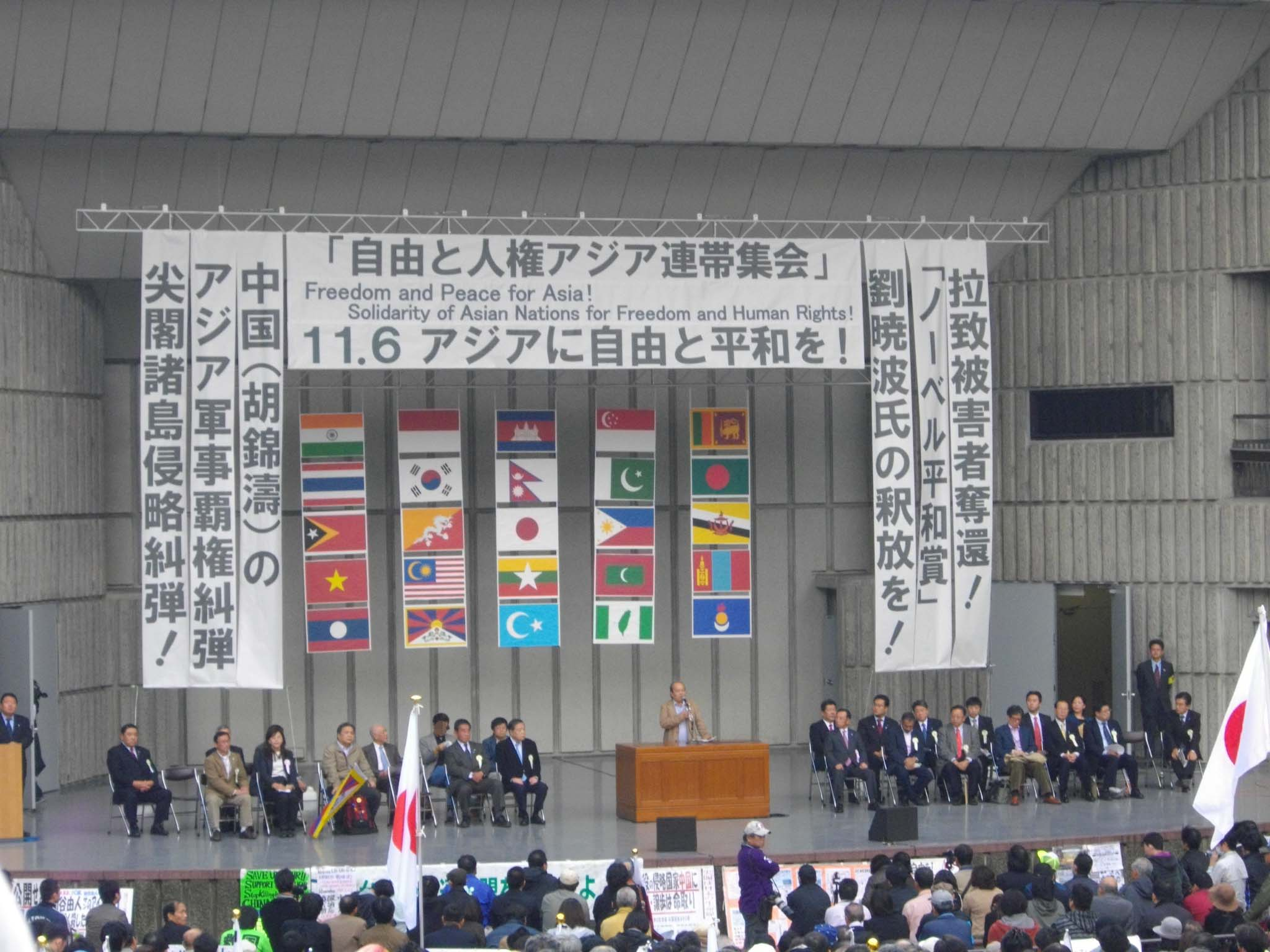
The event "11.6 Freedom and Peace for Asia" on November 6, 2010, at Hibiya Park, Tokyo

- September 7, 2010: The Chinese fishing trawler Minjinyu 5179 collides with two Japanese Coast Guard patrol boats in disputed waters near the Senkaku Islands. The collisions occur between 10 am and 11 am (Yonakuni around 10:16 am, Mizuki around 10:56 am.), after the Japanese Coast Guard ordered the trawler to leave the area. After the collisions, Japanese Coast Guard sailors boarded the Chinese vessel and arrested the captain, Zhan Qixiong. On the same day, Song Tao, Chinese associate minister of foreign affairs, called in Japan's ambassador to China Uichiro Niwa and requested Japan to stop its interception operation.
- September 9: Jiang Yu, spokeswoman of the Ministry of Foreign Affairs of China said that China has sent law enforcement boats of the Fishery Administration to the incident waters. On the same day, Hu Zhengyue, the assistant to the minister of foreign affairs called in Japan's ambassador to China Uichiro Niwa. Hu urged Japan immediately release the trawler together with seamen on board and guarantee their safety and integrity. The Ishigaki Maritime Safety Agency charges Captain Zhan Qixiong with interference with a public servant in the execution of his or her duties and send him to the Ishigaki branch of the District Public Prosecutor's Office in Naha.
- September 12: In the early morning, State Councilor Dai Bingguo called in Japan's ambassador to China Uichiro Niwa. Dai warned the Japanese government: "Don't make false judgement on the current situation, make wise political decisions, and release China's fishermen and trawler immediately."
- September 13: Because of the detention of the Chinese captain, China's embassy told the Affairs Bureau of the House of Representatives (Japan) that Vice Chairman of the Standing Committee of the National People's Congress Li Jianguo decided to delay his 5-day visit to Japan. The trawler and 14 crew members were released and returned to China. Captain Qixiong remains detained in Naha.
- September 16: Seiji Maehara, the Minister of Land, Infrastructure, Transport and Tourism, goes to Ishigaki Maritime Safety Agency and inspects the patrol ships damaged in the incident.
- September 20: China detains four Japanese employees of Fujita Corporation for allegedly filming military targets.
- September 22: China's premier Wen Jiabao delivered a strong-worded address: "I strongly urge Japan to release Zhan Qixiong immediately and unconditionally" when he attended the general assembly of the United Nations in New York. He said Japan had turned a deaf ear to China's repeated serious requests. "If Japan persists willfully and arbitrarily, China will take further actions. Japan shall take full responsibilities for all dire consequences incurred." This is the highest level of protests made by Chinese officials after the collision incident.
- September 24: Japan releases Qixiong, stating that keeping the captain in custody would not be appropriate and was having a considerable impact on Sino-Japan relations.
- September 25: China demands an apology and compensation from Japan for holding the Chinese boat captain. Japan rejects this demand.
- September 27: Japan said it would counter-claim against China for damage to its patrol boats in the collision.
- October 6: Joint US/Japan drill is planned on defending Okinawa in December but Japanese Prime Minister Kan Naoto told the parliament that the joint military exercise does not have the islands specifically in mind.
- October 9: All of the Fujita employees were released by China.
- October 19: In the regular press conference held by the Minister of Foreign Affairs of China, a reporter asked: According to Japanese news sources, the Foreign Minister of Japan Seiji Maehara claimed that China's reaction to the collision is "hysterical". How does China respond to Mr. Seiji's comment? The spokesman Ma Zhaoxu said: "We are deeply astonished that such a comment is made by a foreign minister of some nation."
- November 4: Leaked video footage of the collision appears on YouTube.
- November 9: Supreme Public Prosecutor's Office of Japan launches an investigation against Google over the video leak.
- November 15: Japanese police and prosecutors announced that they would not arrest anyone for the YouTube leak.

== Response in Japan ==
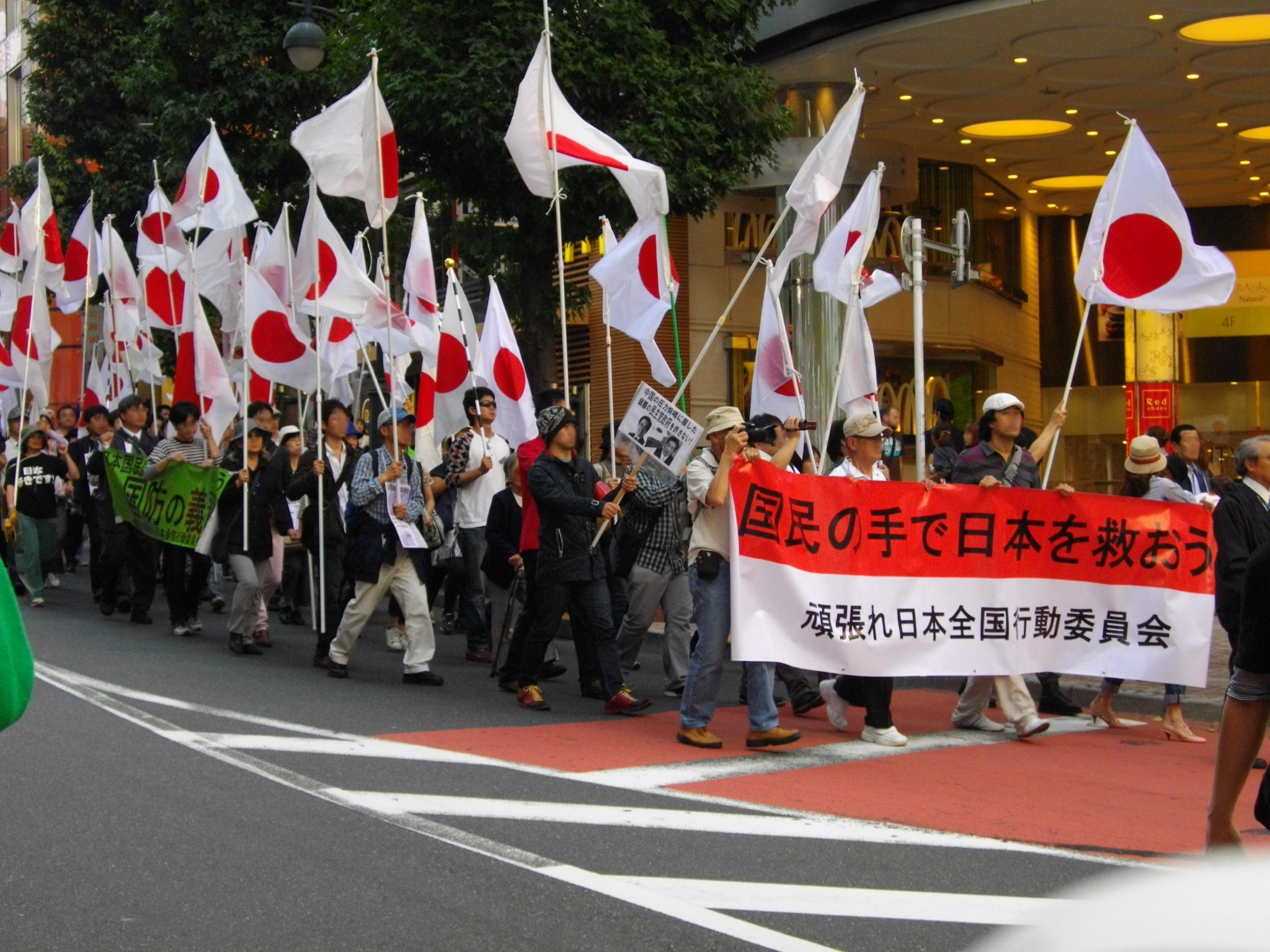
Anti-Chinese government protesters rally at Shibuya, October 2

=== Government ===
The Japanese government claims that there is no territorial dispute over the Senkaku Islands. On September 14, 2010, then-Minister of Land, Infrastructure, Transport and Tourism Seiji Maehara repeatedly asserted this standpoint.

On 19 September, the Japanese government extended its detention of the boat captain on the basis of domestic Japanese law. This detention differed from the Japanese Coast Guard's usual approach of expelling or deporting those that it viewed as intruders in the area. Japan also announced that the disputed islands were covered by the United States-Japan Security Alliance.

=== Business ===
The business community thinks that this incident has exposed China's country risks, called "China risks" (ja:チャイナリスク) in Japan. Japanese companies proactively invest into rare earth mining in countries other than China. Examples include Sumitomo Corporation and Toshiba in Kazakhstan, Marubeni in South Africa, Sojitz and Toyota Tsusho in Vietnam, Sojitsu in Australia, and Sumitomo in the United States. Many companies have shifted the focus of investment away from China to India (the top recipient of Japanese investment) and the ASEAN nations.

=== Protests ===
On October 2, 2010, large-scale anti-Chinese protests occurred in Tokyo and six other cities in Japan.

On November 6, an anti-Chinese demonstration was held in Hibiya Park.

== Response in China ==
In the immediate aftermath of the arrest, the Chinese government sought to restrain hardline Chinese public sentiment. The Chinese government ordered the China Federation for Defending the Diaoyu Islands to withdraw their open letter of protest to the Japanese government. It also stopped a boat trip to the disputed islands from departing Xiamen on 10 September and dispersed anti-Japanese protests in Beijing, Nanjing, Changsha. It instructed PLA media commentators not to talk about the incident, censored key words related to the dispute online, and shut down internet chat rooms.

The Chinese government's position grew firmer over time. The Chinese government viewed Japan's extending of the captain's detention and statements about the islands being covered by the United States-Japan Security Alliance as a change to the status quo treatment of the disputed islands and as an assertion of Japanese de jure sovereignty over them. In response, China detained four Japanese nationals for entering a restricted military area in China and also suspended high-level security exchanges with Japan. Shortly thereafter, China placed informal limits on Japanese tourism and the export of rare earth metals to Japan (whether the restrictions on rare earth exports were a response to the incident remains a matter of debate as of at least 2024).

=== Mainland China ===
==== Beijing ====
- September 8, 2010, mainland Chinese non-governmental fisherman groups took to the streets of Beijing in protest, including a major protest outside the Japanese embassy. Chinese patriotism and anti-Japanese sentiment were evident amongst protestors who waved Chinese flags and sang the national anthem while holding placards demanding that the Japanese withdraw from the islands. A letter of protest was left with Japanese embassy staff along with an ancient Chinese styled copper sheet used to send off a dead person's spirit, as a death wish.
- On September 18, dozens of individuals wearing the increasingly popular "Oppose Japan" shirts held a protest around the Japanese embassy, demanding Japanese withdrawal from the islands and waving maps of China that included the islands as Chinese territories and chanted 'China forever' (lit. "China ten thousand years"/中国万岁/中國萬歲). The protesters posed a much larger danger to the embassy and local police were reinforced to 2–3 times the previous levels. Requests by the police, who were in riot gear, for the protesters to depart were largely unheeded. The embassy instead locked down and police closed off neighbouring streets to limit the increase of protesters and the possibility of chaos.

==== Tianjin ====
- On September 12, 2010, a Japanese private school in Tianjin, China, was vandalised prompting police to increase police presence in Japanese schools, as well as cultural facilities, throughout China. Schools in Tianjin and Beijing (two neighbouring cities) were suspended until September 18.

==== Shanghai ====
- Protests lasted for much of the period September 8–18, 2010 outside the Japanese consulate in Shanghai; several signed petitions and letters of protest were submitted to consulate staff.

==== Other places in mainland China ====
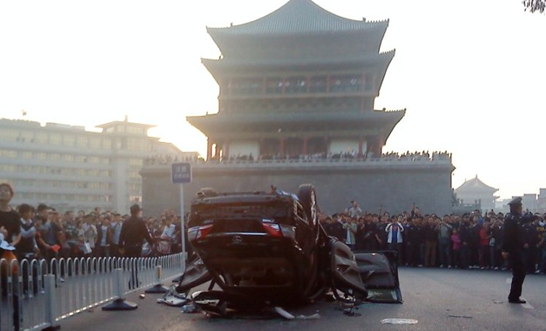
Anti-Japanese protest in Xi'an on October 20, 2010.

- Notable protests took place throughout the rest of China requiring extra police deployment and provisional security measures around Japanese businesses or cultural centres. Additionally, due to the large participation in protests by high school and university students, most schools arranged for mandatory extra Saturday lessons to ensure students were not on the streets protesting. Cities with protesters in excess of 3000 and as high as 10,000 included: Chongqing, Shenyang, Changsha, Xi'an, Zhengzhou, Wuhan, Fujian, Mianyang, and Deyang.

=== Hong Kong ===
- September 13, 2010, Hong Kong fishermen protest outside the Japanese consulate to China in Central, Hong Kong. Protestors burned Japanese flags and chanted slogans, particularly Japan get out of Diaoyu Islands!. In a more official manner representatives from Hong Kong's political parties spoke to consulate officials requesting a swift release of the detained fishermen.
- On September 18, the consulate was once again surrounded and protesters wished to pass a notice of protest, however as it was a Saturday, the majority of the consular staff were not present and so the protesters did not receive a response. The protesters then turned to burning the objects in protest. In the northern Sha Tin district citizens gathered and burned Japanese flags and products too.

=== Taiwan ===
- On September 14, 2010, a rally was held in front of the Japanese Interchange Association in Taiwan. The protesters threw fish and burned Japanese flags to voice their anger.

== Response in other countries ==
=== United States ===
On September 23, 2010, United States Secretary of State Hillary Clinton told Japanese Foreign Minister Seiji Maehara that Senkaku and nearby waters are covered by the Treaty of Mutual Cooperation and Security between the United States and Japan, which obligates the United States to defend Japanese territory from attacks by third-party countries, and maintained that it does not have a position regarding the sovereignty of the islands. At a press conference held on the same day, United States Secretary of Defense Robert Gates said that in the event of military conflict over the Senkaku Islands, "Washington would honor its military commitment to intervene". A reporter posed the same question to clarify an earlier Kyodo report that "US changed its position", similar statements were made at a US State Department Press Conference a month previously on August 16, 2010: "The U.S. position on this issue is longstanding and has not changed. The United States does not take a position on the question of the ultimate sovereignty of the Senkaku Islands. We expect the claimants to resolve this issue through peaceful means among themselves. But Article 5 of the 1960 U.S.-Japan Treaty of Mutual Cooperation and Security states that the treaty applies to the territories under the administration of Japan. There's no change. That (Kyodo) report is incorrect."

At the press conference on September 23, 2010, United States Assistant Secretary of State for Public Affairs Philip J. Crowley stated in response to a question whether Senkaku islands are covered by the security treaty that "We do believe that because the Senkaku Islands are under Japanese jurisdiction, that it is covered by the U.S.-Japan security treaty. That said, we also stress that we don't take a position on the sovereignty of the Senkaku Islands, but recognize current Japanese jurisdiction stemming back to the reversion of Okinawa to Japan."

== Video of incident ==
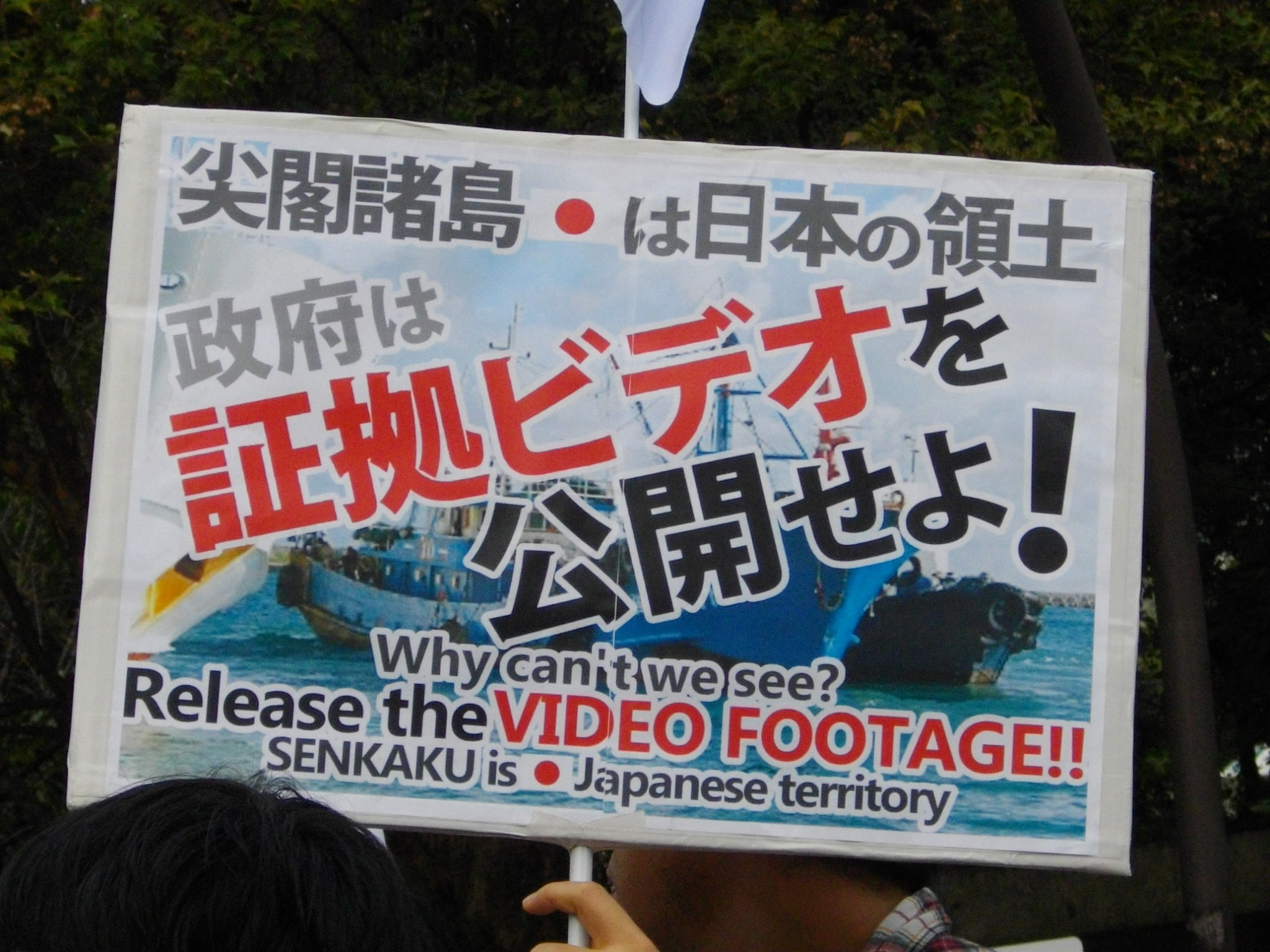
A Japanese protest placard against the unreleasing of the video of the collisions

=== Internal circulation ===
The Japanese government was unwilling to release the videos, originally stating that the videos may constitute evidence in a future court case. Trying to avoid further provoking China was another reason cited for not releasing the videos. Upon repeated demands from legislators in the Diet from some members of various parties (DPJ and LDP included), a viewing was finally arranged on November 1, 2010. During the viewing, only an edited version of 6'50" duration was seen.

=== The leak ===
On November 4, 2010, video footage of the collisions taken by the Japan Coast Guard was leaked on YouTube, and authorities later confirmed authenticity of the video clips. The leaked clips totaled 44 minutes, but were taken down about ten hours later with the original poster sengoku38's account deleted. However, the original video is said to run more than two hours. This is supported by the fact that in some of the videos other crew members were also holding video cameras doing recordings.

It was later revealed that the leak was done by a Japan Coast Guard Navigator from the Kobe Coast Guard Office, Masaharu Isshiki (ja:一色正春). He first sent a SD memory card with a copy of the footage of the incident to the offices of CNN in Japan, then when CNN did not post the contents of the memory card he uploaded the video to YouTube.

=== Reactions to the leak and the video clips ===
The Japanese government views the leak as a breach of confidentiality and security. Contrary to Naoto Kan government's claim that releasing the video might upset China, the Chinese government does not seem to mind the leak, stating that "The so-called video can neither change the facts nor cover up Japan's crime." A few hours later, China Ministry of Foreign Affairs spokesman Hong Lei said, "I would like to reiterate that the Japanese patrol boats had disturbed, driven away, intercepted and surrounded the Chinese fishing boat, which led to the collision."

Meanwhile, both Japanese civilians and Chinese civilians and media in mainland China, Hong Kong and Taiwan welcomed the leak citing their right to know. Each group viewed the content of the video as presenting evidence favorable to their own cause in the dispute. Japanese claim the videos show Minjinyu 5179 rammed into JCG boats Yonakuni and Mizuki. Chinese claim that the two JCG boats cut in front of the Chinese trawler abruptly and are equally responsible for the collision, citing the much smaller size and slower speed of the Minjinyu 5179 and the wake of the JCG boats left in front of Minjinyu 5179.

Although YouTube is blocked inside mainland China, the videos were quickly reproduced on many Chinese websites.

=== Links to the leaked video clips ===
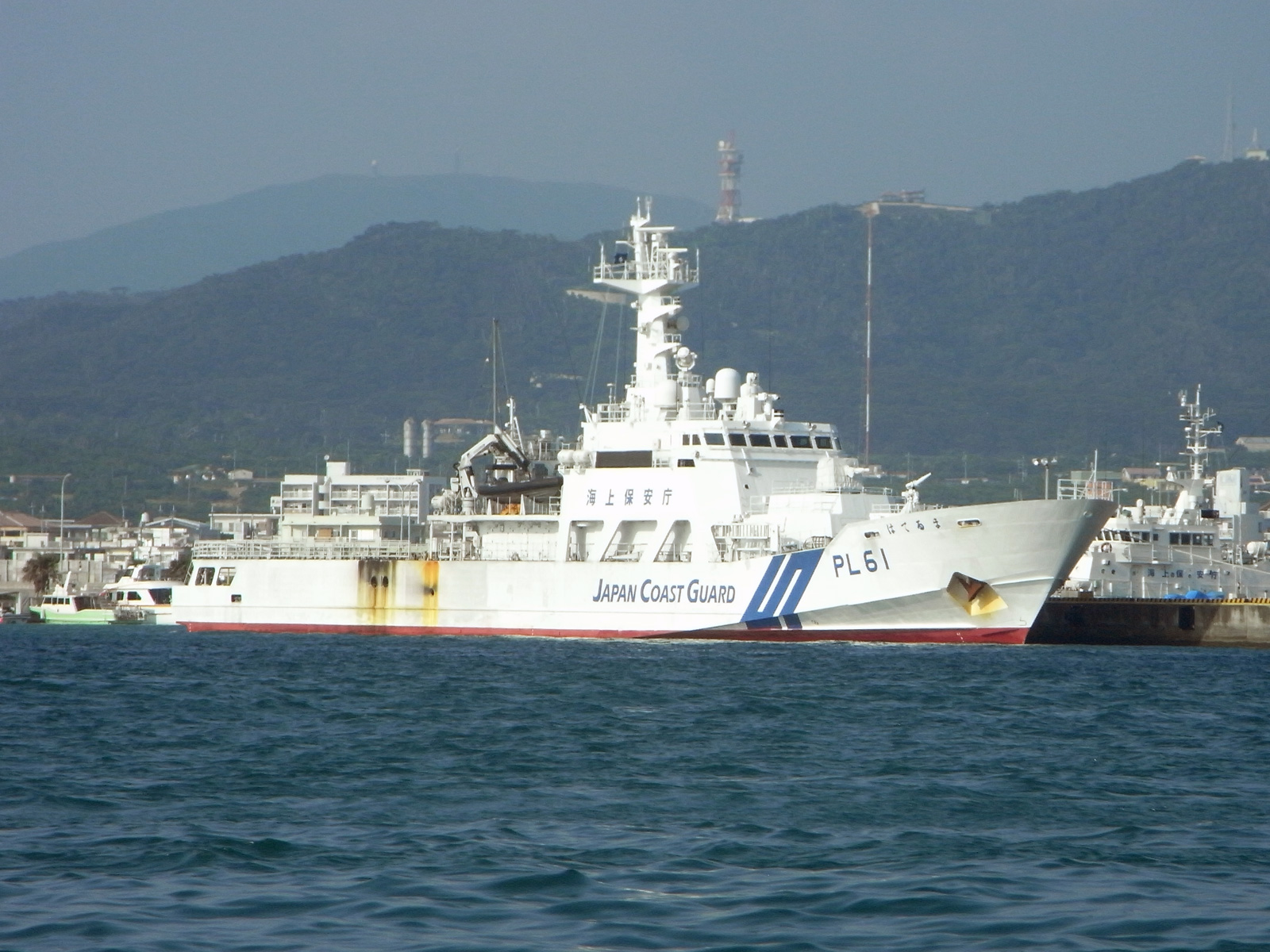
JCG's Hateruma that captured the moment of collision

Original posted name	Duration of clip	Taken by	Comments
本当の尖閣 海上保安庁1	7'30"	Yonakuni, a Hateruma-class patrol vessel	
尖閣の真実 海上保安庁2	8'9"	Yonakuni, a Hateruma-class patrol vessel	JCG tried to order Minjinyu 5179 to stop
尖閣侵略の真実 海上保安庁3	11'21"	Yonakuni, a Hateruma-class patrol vessel	
本当の尖閣 海上保安庁4	11'24"	Yonakuni, a Hateruma-class patrol vessel	first collision with Yonakuni
日本の尖閣 海上保安庁5	3'33"	Mizuki, a Bizan-class patrol vessel	second collision with Mizuki
どうなる尖閣 海上保安庁6	2'29"	Hateruma, a Hateruma-class patrol vessel	second collision with Mizuki, viewed by afar

1. Japan Coast Guard orders the fishing boat to stop on YouTube
2. Chinese trawler Minjinyu5179 pulls back round haul nets on YouTube
3. Chinese trawler Minjinyu5179 attempts to evade on YouTube
4. Chinese trawler Minjinyu5179 collides with JCG's patrol vessel Yonakuni at 2:11, video taken by Yonakuni on YouTube
5. Chinese trawler Minjinyu5179 collides again with another JCG's vessel Mizuki at 1:10, video taken by Mizuki on YouTube, Chinese trawler Minjinyu5179 collides with Mizuki video with English subtitles on YouTube
6. Mizuki-Minjinyu5179 Collision captured from a different angle by JCG boat Hateruma at a distance on YouTube

== Aftermath ==
According to the Asahi Shimbun, since returning to China government authorities have confined Zhan Qixiong to his home. An Asahi reporter who attempted to interview Qixiong at his home in Jinjiang on September 5, 2011, was turned away by Chinese police. Local residents confirmed to the reporter that Qixiong was living at the residence but was not allowed to leave except in rare instances. Two holes in the bow of Minjinyu 5179, apparently caused by the collisions, have been repaired since the boat returned to China, but the boat has not been on any further fishing expeditions. Local Jinjiang fishermen told the Asahi reporter that they have mainly stayed away from the Senkaku Islands since the incident, but would go back, "as long as there were fish in the area."

== See also ==
- Senkaku Islands dispute
- 2010 Eocheong boat collision incident
- Lu Yan Yuan Yu 010
