= Oureratou Ouedraogo =

Burkinabè economist and development consultant

Oureratou Ouédraogo
- Citizenship: Burkinabè
- Education: Master's degree in economics and a Postgraduate Diploma in international gender studies
- Occupation: Development consultant
- Known for: Representative of the United Nations Industrial Development Organization (UNIDO)

Oureratou Ouédraogo is a Burkinabè economist and development consultant specializing in sustainable development, energy policy, and gender-sensitive development strategies. She is serving as the Country Representative for the United Nations Industrial Development Organization (UNIDO) in Burkina Faso, where she oversees initiatives focused on promoting sustainable industrial development and inclusive economic growth. Her professional background includes senior roles in the national energy sector and advisory work on development programs in West Africa and the Sahel.

== Biography ==
Oureratou Ouédraogo holds a Master’s degree in Economics and a Postgraduate Diploma in International Gender Studies. She is pursuing an MBA in Administration and Management. Her academic background and professional experience have equipped her with expertise in project design, public policy analysis, and monitoring and evaluation, with a particular focus on sustainable development and gender equality.

Before joining the United Nations Industrial Development Organization (UNIDO), Ouédraogo served as the Head of the Economic and Financial Studies Department at the National Electricity Company of Burkina Faso (SONABEL). In this capacity, she contributed in the development of the national energy strategy and in structuring investment programs for the energy sector.

== Professional career ==
Oureratou Ouédraogo has worked as a national and international consultant on several development projects in West Africa and the Sahel region. Her work has focused on evaluating livelihood vulnerability reduction programs, promoting sustainable agricultural practices, and integrating gender considerations into community development policies and projects.

In 2025, she became the United Nations Industrial Development Organization UNIDO Country Representative in Burkina Faso. In this role, she coordinated partnerships with national authorities and international partners to promote inclusive and sustainable industrial development.

As part of her duties as Country Representative, she met with the Japanese Ambassador to discuss industrial cooperation issues.

== United Nations Industrial Development Organization (UNIDO) Position ==
As a Country Representative of the United Nations Industrial Development Organization (UNIDO) in Burkina Faso, she coordinates the organization's activities in line with national industrial development priorities.

She presented her credentials to the Burkinabe authorities and to the UN Resident Coordinator in Burkina Faso. She works to strengthen cooperation between UNIDO and national and international partners, particularly in the agriculture, energy, and mining sectors. Her work also focuses on developing local value chains, promoting employment, and supporting sustainable industrialization, in collaboration with technical, financial, and diplomatic partners.

== Commitments ==
Oureratou Ouédraogo is among the 7 African women involved in climate justice initiatives

In 2023, Oureratou Ouédraogo served as coordinator of the African Activists for Climate Justice program, implemented in several African countries, including Burkina Faso, in partnership with civil society organizations. In this capacity, she participates in dialogue activities with the media and community stakeholders on issues of climate justice, community resilience, and the integration of local narratives into public policy development.

Alongside her institutional roles, Oureratou Ouédraogo is involved in initiatives related to empowerment of women and youth. She participates in regional and international dialogue frameworks dedicated to energy transition, economic resilience, and sustainable development.
