= Visa policy of Japan =

Policy on permits required to enter Japan

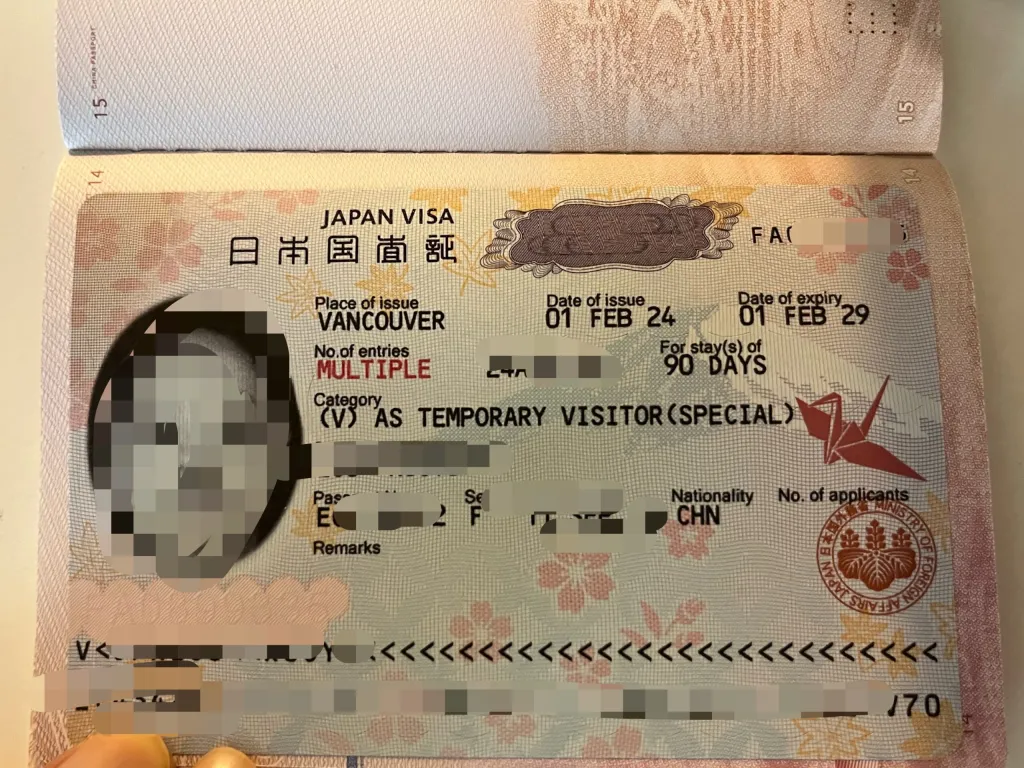
A multiple-entry Japanese temporary visitor visa, 2023-present format

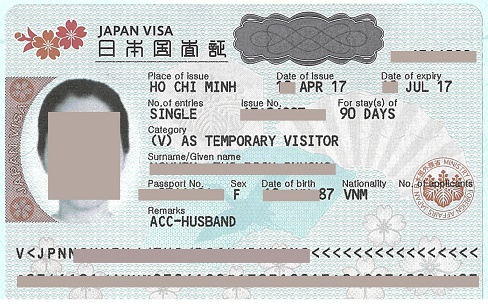
A single-entry Japanese temporary visitor visa, 2016-2023 format

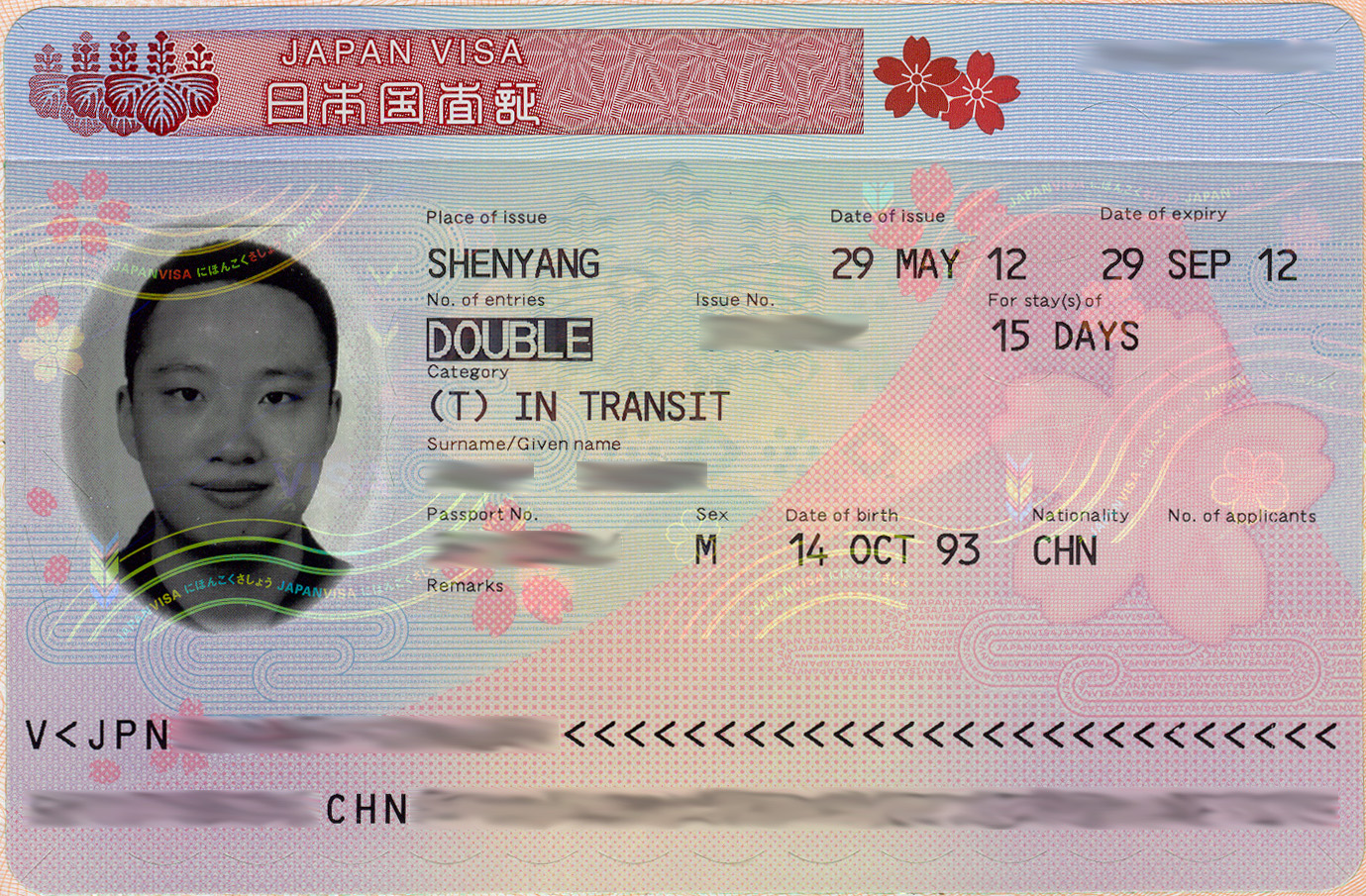
A double-entry Japanese transit visa on a Chinese passport (Old design)

Visitors to Japan must obtain a visa from one of the Japanese diplomatic missions unless they are citizens from one of the visa-exempt countries or transit within 72 hours.

== Visa policy map ==
Visa policy of Japan Japan Visa not required - 90 days (extendable up to 6 months) Visa not required - 90 days Visa not required - 30 days (pre-registration) Visa not required - 15 days (pre-registration) eVisa - 90 days eVisa (conditional) Visa-free for indirect landside transit (72 hours) Admission refused

== Visa exemption ==
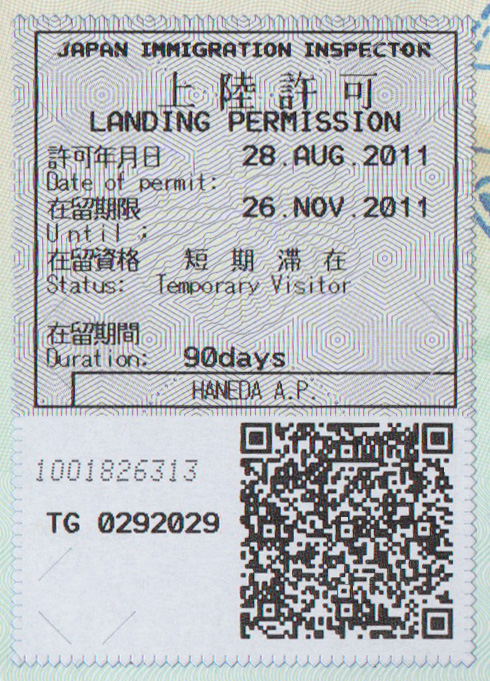
A Japanese temporary visitor landing permission sticker issued at the Haneda Airport on a Taiwan passport in 2011

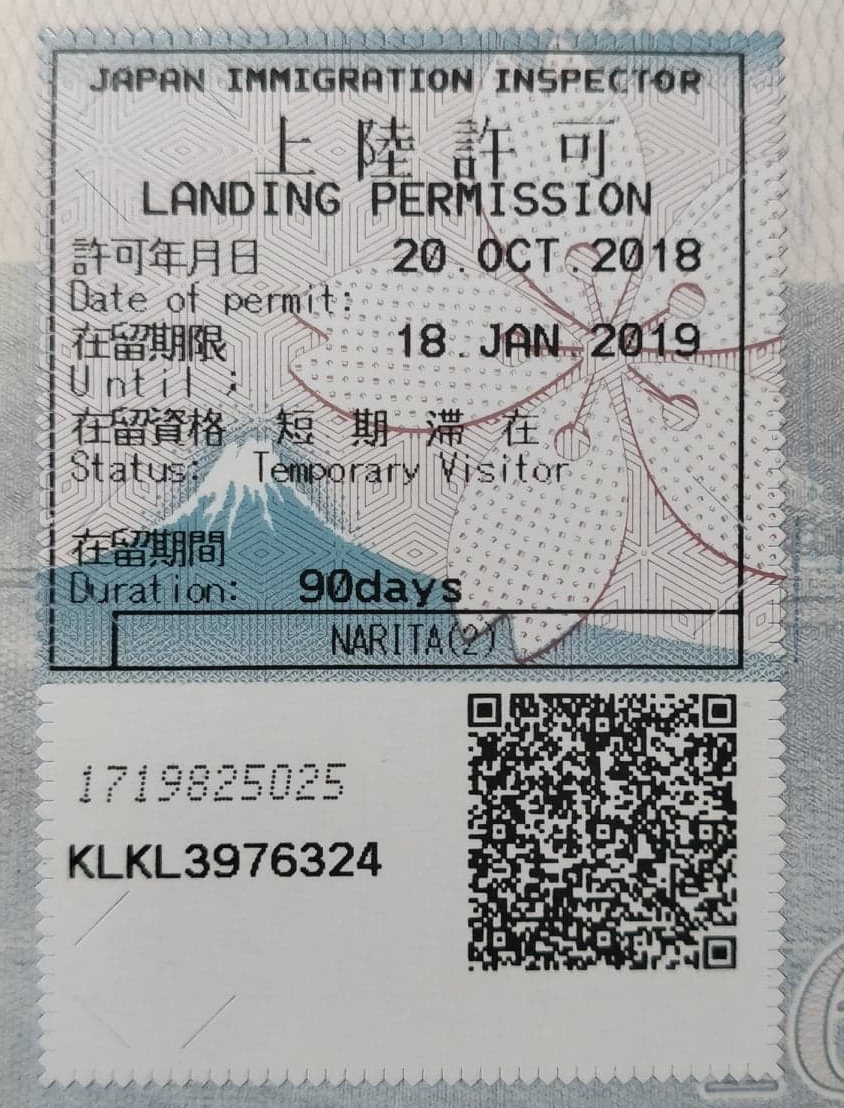
The Japanese temporary visitor landing permission stickers issued at the Narita Airport in 2018

=== Ordinary passports ===
Citizens of the following countries and territories may enter Japan without a visa for the following period:

90 days
- All European Union member states^{E}
- Andorra
- Argentina
- Australia
- Bahamas
- Barbados^{PM}
- Brazil^{PB}
- Canada
- Chile
- Costa Rica
- Dominican Republic
- El Salvador
- Guatemala
- Honduras
- Hong Kong^{1}
- Iceland
- Israel
- Lesotho^{PM}
- Liechtenstein^{E}
- Macau^{1}
- Malaysia^{PB}
- Mauritius
- Mexico^{E}
- Monaco
- Montenegro^{PB}
- New Zealand
- North Macedonia
- Norway
- Panama^{PB}
- Paraguay^{PB}
- Peru^{PB}
- San Marino
- Serbia^{PB}
- Singapore
- South Korea
- Suriname
- Switzerland^{E}
- Taiwan^{2}
- Tunisia
- Turkey^{PM}
- United Arab Emirates^{PB}
- United Kingdom^{E 3}
- United States
- Uruguay
30 days
- Brunei
- Qatar^{R PB}
15 days
- Indonesia^{R PB}
- Thailand^{PB}

_{E - Citizens of Austria, Germany, Ireland, Liechtenstein, Mexico, Switzerland and the United Kingdom may apply for an extension of stay (up to a maximum of 6 months) at the Ministry of Justice.}
_{R - Passport must be registered for visa waiver online or at a Japanese diplomatic mission. The registration is valid for three years or until the passport expires, whichever comes first.}
_{PB - Biometric passport required.}
_{PM - Machine-readable passport required.}
_{1 - For Chinese citizens with Hong Kong Special Administrative Region passports or Macao Special Administrative Region passports only.}
_{2 - For holders of Taiwan passports that include a personal identification number.}
_{3 - For British citizens and British Nationals (Overseas) with the right of abode in Hong Kong only. Holders of British passports from British Overseas Territories, regardless of whether the passport specifies British Citizen or not, are excluded.}

Date of visa changes
- Unknown: Barbados;
- 1 July 1955: West Germany (continues to apply to Germany)
- 1 December 1955: France
- 15 January 1956: Italy
- 10 June 1956: Greece
- 14 June 1956: Tunisia
- 15 August 1956: Belgium and Denmark
- 28 August 1956: Netherlands
- 1 September 1956: Norway and Sweden
- 15 April 1957: Liechtenstein and Switzerland
- 19 April 1957: Dominican Republic
- 5 January 1958: Turkey
- 1 April 1958: Austria (previously also from 1 September 1928 to 13 March 1938)
- 1 February 1959: Finland
- 1 August 1960: Luxembourg
- 1 January 1962: Argentina
- 2 December 1962: United Kingdom
- 20 September 1964: Canada
- 15 April 1965: Spain
- 1 September 1966: Ireland
- 20 November 1966: Iceland
- 1 June 1967: Yugoslavia (may continue to apply to Croatia and Slovenia)
- 15 February 1968: San Marino
- 15 November 1969: Chile
- 15 June 1970: New Zealand
- 1 October 1971: Israel
- 1 January 1972: Singapore
- 10 April 1972: Mexico
- 25 February 1973: El Salvador
- 1 March 1973: Malta
- 1 April 1973: Cyprus
- 1 March 1974: Portugal
- 2 May 1974: Uruguay
- 27 May 1974: Suriname
- 1 June 1974: Honduras
- 16 September 1974: Costa Rica
- 1 January 1976: Guatemala
- 15 July 1977: Lesotho
- 1 July 1980: Mauritius
- 1 October 1981: Bahamas
- 20 June 1986: Brunei (14 days)
- 15 December 1988: United States
- 11 November 1996: Andorra
- 1 April 1997: North Macedonia
- 21 June 1997: Hungary
- 10 September 1998: Czech Republic
- 1 December 1998: Australia
- 14 February 1999: Poland
- 23 September 1999: Monaco
- 1 December 1999: Estonia
- 1 April 2000: Latvia and Lithuania
- 22 March 2002: Slovakia
- 1 April 2004: Hong Kong and British Nationals (Overseas)
- 1 March 2005: South Korea
- 25 March 2005: Macau
- 1 May 2005: Bulgaria
- 26 September 2005: Taiwan
- 1 September 2009: Romania
- 1 May 2011: Serbia
- 1 July 2013: Malaysia (previously also from 1 March 1983 to 1 June 1993) and Thailand
- 1 December 2014: Indonesia (for pre-registered passports)
- 1 November 2022: United Arab Emirates (30 days; previously also from 1 July 2017 for pre-registered passports)
- 2 April 2023: Qatar (for pre-registered passports)
- 30 September 2023: Brazil
- 1 April 2024: Panama
- 10 December 2024: Brunei (extension to 30 days)
- 1 June 2025: Paraguay, United Arab Emirates (extension to 90 days)
- 1 July 2025: Peru (previously also from February 1972 to 15 July 1995)
- 1 September 2025: Montenegro

Cancelled:

- Pakistan: 1 January 1961 to 15 January 1989
- Bangladesh: 20 August 1973 to 15 January 1989
- Iran: 1 October 1974 to 15 April 1992

==== Electronic Travel Authorization (JESTA) ====
In June 2024, the Japanese government announced future plans to try and introduce an online travel authorization system called JESTA for visa-exempt visitors, as part of a migration legislative reform by the year 2030.

The new system will require foreign visitors who are exempt from obtaining short-stay visas to declare information such as the purpose of their stay online before entering Japan.

This measure aims to prevent illegal stays and will be implemented by the Immigration Services Agency, drawing inspiration from the United States' Electronic System for Travel Authorization (ESTA).

=== Non-ordinary passports ===
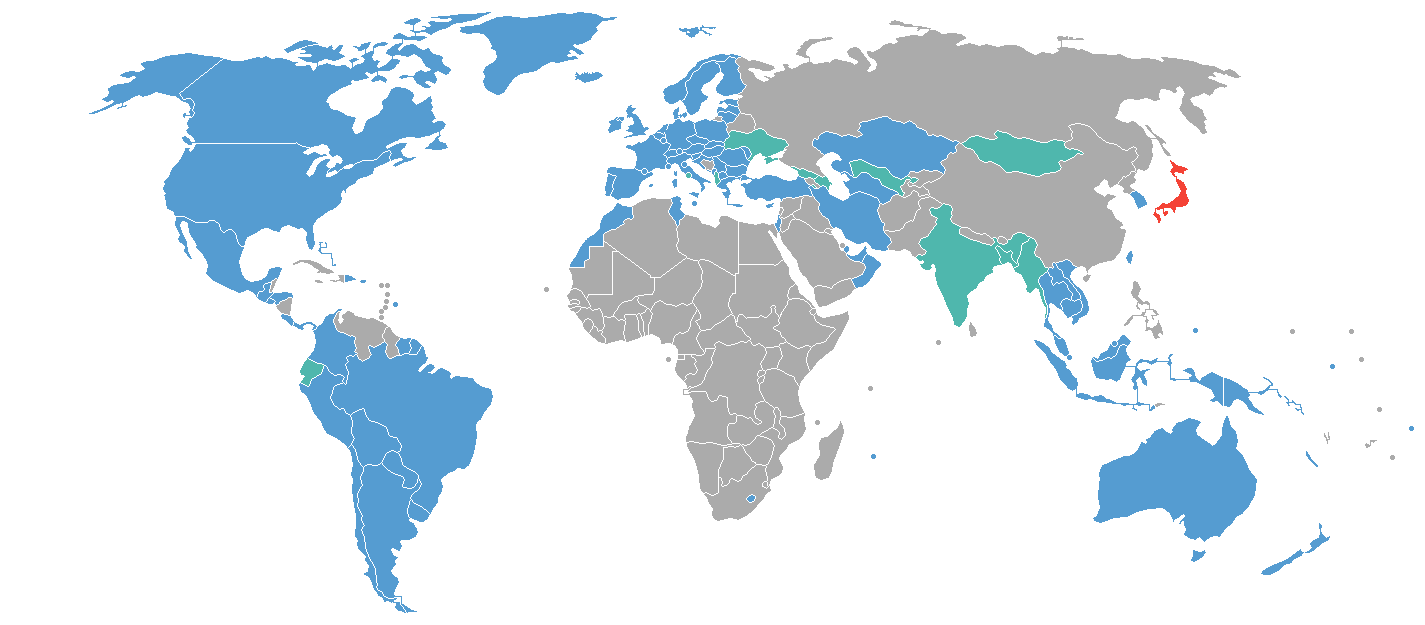
Japan Visa exemption for diplomatic and official passports Visa exemption for diplomatic passports

Holders of diplomatic, official or service passports of the following countries may enter Japan without a visa for a maximum period of 90 days each visit (unless otherwise stated):

- All European Union member states
- Albania
- Andorra
- Angola (Note: Only for holders of diplomatic passports.)
- Argentina
- Australia
- Azerbaijan
- Bahrain
- Bahamas
- Bangladesh
- Bolivia
- Barbados
- Bosnia and Herzegovina
- Brazil
- Brunei (Note: For stays of up to 30 days.)
- Cambodia
- Canada
- Chile
- Colombia
- Costa Rica
- Dominican Republic
- Ecuador
- El Salvador
- Georgia
- Guatemala
- Honduras
- Iceland
- India
- Indonesia
- Iran
- Israel
- Kazakhstan
- Kosovo
- Kuwait
- Kyrgyzstan
- Laos
- Lesotho
- Liechtenstein
- Malaysia
- Maldives
- Marshall Islands
- Mauritius
- Mexico (Note: Citizens of Mexico are normally granted a visa exemption of up to 6 months. However, if they wish to stay in Japan for longer than 90 days, they are required apply for an extension of the Ministry of Justice before the period of permitted stay is to expire.)
- Moldova
- Monaco
- Mongolia
- Montenegro
- Morocco
- Myanmar
- Nauru
- New Zealand
- North Macedonia
- Norway
- Oman
- Palau
- Panama
- Papua New Guinea
- Paraguay
- Peru
- Philippines
- Qatar
- Samoa
- San Marino
- Serbia (Note: Visas are not required only for holders of ICAO-compliant e-Passports.)
- Saudi Arabia
- Singapore
- Solomon Islands
- South Korea
- Suriname
- Switzerland
- Thailand
- Tunisia
- Turkey
- Turkmenistan
- Ukraine
- United Kingdom
- United Arab Emirates
- United States (Note: For citizens of the United States who visit Japan for sightseeing or private purposes (not for official purpose).)
- Uruguay
- Uzbekistan
- Vatican City
- Vietnam

Holders of diplomatic and official passports of other countries to whom a visa exemption applies when using an ordinary passport are also exempted from a visa, but are granted the status of residence as temporary visitors under the same conditions and maximum stay as with an ordinary passport. This exemption does not apply to holders of diplomatic and official passports of Taiwan, and to those of the United States traveling for official purposes.

- In addition, all nationals of selected visa-exempt countries and territories entering Japan with a United Nations laissez-passer may enter Japan visa-free for up to the periods stated varying between 30 – 90 days under current reciprocal agreements.
- In addition, all Interpol Passport Holders regardless of nationality may enter Japan visa-free for 90 days.

=== APEC Business Travel Card ===
Holders of passports of the following jurisdictions who also hold an APEC Business Travel Card (ABTC) containing the code "JPN" on the reverse may travel to Japan without a visa for business purposes for stays of up to 90 days:

- Australia
- Brunei
- Chile
- China
- Hong Kong
- Indonesia
- Malaysia
- Mexico
- New Zealand
- Papua New Guinea
- Peru
- Philippines
- Russia
- Singapore
- South Korea
- Taiwan
- Thailand
- Vietnam

== Visa-free transit ==
Japan's transit without visa (TWOV) policy, as stipulated in articles 14 and 15 of the Immigration Control and Refugee Recognition Act, allows travellers to enter Japan for up to 72 hours under specific conditions. To qualify for this policy, travellers must transit to a third country via Japan, stay in the designated area in the vicinity of the port of entry and obtain an application form from the flight or vessel company.

The Ministry of Justice of Japan listed sightseeing, rest, making purchases and emergency as some of the permitted purposes. If a passenger departs at the same port of entry (寄港地上陸, "Landing at a Port of Call"), the passenger will be issued a Shore Pass (寄港地上陸許可, "Permission for Landing at a Port of Call"). If a passenger departs at a port different from the port of entry, the passenger will be issued a Transit Pass (通過上陸許可, "Permission for Landing in Transit").

Immigration official may refuse to issue a Shore Pass or Transit Pass if a passenger fails to present a confirmed e-ticket leaving from Japan.

=== Ports of Entry Requirement for Transit Pass ===
According to International Air Transport Association, passengers should arrive and depart at the same group of ports of Entry to be eligible for a Transit Pass.

Group A:

- Airports: Narita (NRT), Haneda (HND), Nagoya (NGO), Niigata (KIJ), Komatsu (KMQ) and Yokota (OKO)
- Seaports: Tokyo, Yokohama, Niigata, and Nagoya

Group B:

- Airports: Osaka (KIX), Nagoya (NGO) and Komatsu (KMQ)
- Seaports: Osaka, Kobe and Nagoya

Group C:

- Airports: Fukuoka (FUK), Nagasaki (NGS), Kumamoto (KMJ), Kagoshima (KOJ), Naha (OKA) and Kadena (DNA)
- Seaports: Hakata (Fukuoka), Shimonoseki and Naha (Okinawa)

Group D:

- Airport: Chitose (CTS)
- Seaports: Tomakomai, Otaru, Hakodate and Muroran.

== Electronic visa (e-Visa) ==
Japan eVisa
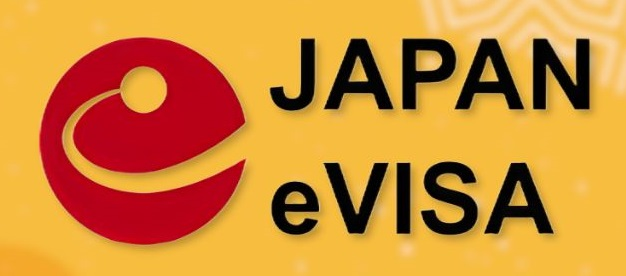

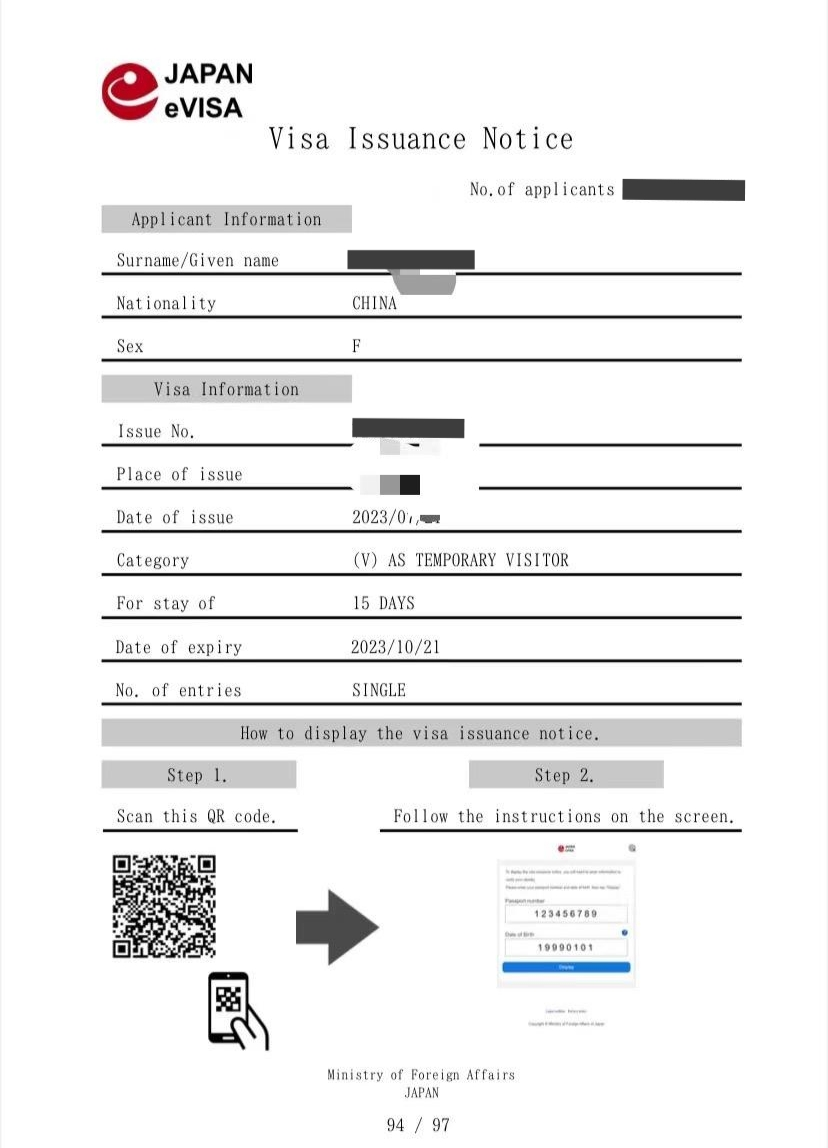
- Sample of Japanese eVisa Issuance Notice
- Owner: Ministry of Foreign Affairs
- Website: evisa.mofa.go.jp

Residents of the following countries, of any nationality, may apply online for an electronic visa (e-Visa), valid for a single entry for a stay of up to 90 days.

- Australia
- Brazil
- Cambodia
- Canada
- Saudi Arabia
- South Africa
- Taiwan
- United Kingdom
- United States

Certain other foreign nationals may also apply for single-entry eVisas through accredited agencies:

- Nationals of China residing in their own country may stay for up to 15 or 30 days
- Residents of Hong Kong, India, Indonesia, Macau, Mongolia, Singapore, South Korea (excluding those under the jurisdiction of the Consulate General of Japan in Jeju) and United Arab Emirates, of any nationality, for a stay of up to 90 days
- Nationals of Philippines residing in their country may participate in package tours organized by designated travel agencies
- Nationals of Vietnam residing in their country may participate in package tours organized by designated travel agencies and stay for up to 15 days

The e-Visa holders must arrive in Japan by air or scheduled passenger ferry. They must use a mobile device to enter the designated website to display their e-Visa notice, as screenshots, files and printed copies are not considered valid proof of the e-Visa.

== History ==
Japan historically had special visa policies for citizens of countries of the Commonwealth of Independent States who could not provide their financial guarantees and obtain a visa independently. Instead, they had to apply through an approved travel agency or be invited by a resident or citizen of Japan. However, these requirements were gradually lifted, starting with citizens of Russia on 1 January 2017, followed by Georgia, Kazakhstan, Kyrgyzstan, Tajikistan, Turkmenistan, and Uzbekistan on 5 June 2017. Armenia's requirements were lifted on 1 September 2017, Azerbaijan's on 1 December 2017, and those for Belarus, Moldova, and Ukraine on 1 January 2018.

The Ministry of Foreign Affairs of Japan has also maintained special visa policies for nationals of China and the Philippines, requiring them to apply through an accredited travel agent or be invited by a Japanese citizen or resident. In 2014, a simplified process was introduced for nationals of the Philippines and Vietnam traveling in groups through registered travel agencies, allowing them to obtain entry visas for tourist visits up to 15 days with fewer required documents. Additionally, nationals of India, the Philippines, and Vietnam can obtain multiple-entry visas if they have previously visited Japan and other G7 countries or demonstrate "sufficient financial capability."

Starting in 2015, Chinese tourists traveling on approved cruise ships have been allowed to enter Japan without a visa, provided they embark and disembark the same specified ships. In 2016, Japan reportedly planned to further ease visa requirements for visitors from key markets such as India, China, and Vietnam. This new wave of visa liberalization policies began on 17 October 2016 for Chinese nationals and on 1 January 2018 for Indian nationals.

In response to the COVID-19 pandemic, Japan suspended visa exemptions for most countries beginning in March 2020 and later extended this suspension to all countries. These exemptions were subsequently restored on 11 October 2022. As of 2024, Japan has further expanded its visa policies by allowing Indian nationals and those residing in India to be eligible for e-Visas.

== Visitor statistics ==
In 2015 4,768,286 Japanese visas were issued. It is an increase of 66% from 2014 when 2,871,639 visas were issued and the highest number ever recorded.

Most visas were applied for by nationals of the following countries:

Nationality	Issued visas in 2017	Share	Issued visas in 2015	Share	Issued visas in 2014	Share	Issued visas in 2013	Issued visas in 2012
China	4,504,718	77%	3,780,773	79%	2,048,106	71%	971,542	1,112,407
Philippines	325,564	5%	225,676	5%	163,386	6%	99,258	74,424
Indonesia	239,201	4%	162,273	3%	141,321	5%	122,376	90,498
Vietnam	226,993	4%	139,236	3%	96,648	3%	65,305	39,581
India	96,658	2%	74,088	2%	66,696	2%	55,622	50,938
Russia	67,445	1%	47,813	1%	57,606	2%	54,948	45,468
Brazil	50,885	1%	38,798	1%	34,217	1%	28,697	35,049
Thailand	—N/a	—N/a	20,857	1%	21,322	1%	183,684	228,528
South Korea	—N/a	—N/a	20,399	0%	18,861	1%	21,644	22,964
United States	—N/a	—N/a	19,349	0%	19,017	1%	—N/a	—N/a
Malaysia	—N/a	—N/a	—N/a	—N/a	—N/a	—N/a	70,231	115,348
Others	357,548	6%	239,026	5%	204,459	7%	191,118	171.316

Foreign tourists to Japan

Most visitors arriving in Japan were from the following countries of nationality: In 2015 most visas were issued for group sightseeing (1,957,498) and individual sightseeing (1,126,209). There were 62,052 multiple-entry visas for Okinawa and 10,500 multiple-entry visas for three prefectures in Tōhoku.

Nationality	2024	2023	2022	2019	2018	2017	2016	2015	2014	2013
South Korea	▲8,817,765	▲6,175,768	▼1,012,751	▼5,584,597	▲7,538,952	▲7,140,200	▲5,090,302	▲4,002,095	▲2,755,313	▲2,456,165
China	▲6,981,342	▲2,112,683	▼189,125	▲9,594,394	▲8,380,034	▲7,355,800	▲6,373,564	▲4,993,689	▲2,409,158	▼1,314,437
Taiwan	▲6,044,316	▲3,802,934	▼331,097	▲4,890,602	▲4,757,258	▲4,564,100	▲4,167,512	▲3,677,075	▲2,829,821	▲2,210,821
Hong Kong	▲2,683,391	▲1,863,322	▼269,285	▲2,290,792	▼2,207,804	▲2,231,500	▲1,839,193	▲1,524,292	▲925,975	▲745,881
United States	▲2,724,594	▲1,862,688	▼323,513	▲1,723,861	▲1,526,407	▲1,375,000	▲1,242,719	▲1,033,258	▲891,668	▲799,280
Thailand	▲1,148,848	▲869,736	▼198,037	▲1,318,977	▲1,132,160	▲987,100	▲901,525	▲796,731	▲657,570	▲453,642
Australia	▲920,196	▲523,591	▼88,648	▲621,771	▲552,440	▲495,100	▲445,332	▲376,075	▲302,656	▲244,569
Malaysia	▲506,883	▲354,906	▼74,095	▲501,592	▲468,360	▲439,500	▲394,268	▲305,447	▲249,521	▲176,521
Philippines	▲818,659	▲543,186	▼126,842	▲613,114	▲503,976	▲424,200	▲347,861	▲268,361	▲184,204	▲108,351
Singapore	▲691,226	▲477,572	▼131,969	▲492,252	▲437,280	▲404,100	▲361,807	▲308,783	▲227,962	▲189,280
Vietnam	▲621,173	▲536,869	▼284,113	▲495,051	▲389,005	▲308,898	▲233,763	▲185,395	▲124,266	▲84,469
Indonesia	▲517,651	▲365,686	▼119,723	▲412,779	▲396,852	▲352,330	▲271,014	▲205,083	▲158,739	▲136,797
Total (including others)	▲36,870,148	▲22,332,235	▼3,832,110	▲31,882,049	▲31,191,856	▲28,690,900	▲24,039,053	▲19,737,409	▲13,413,467	▲10,363,904

== Re-entry Permit as a Visa ==
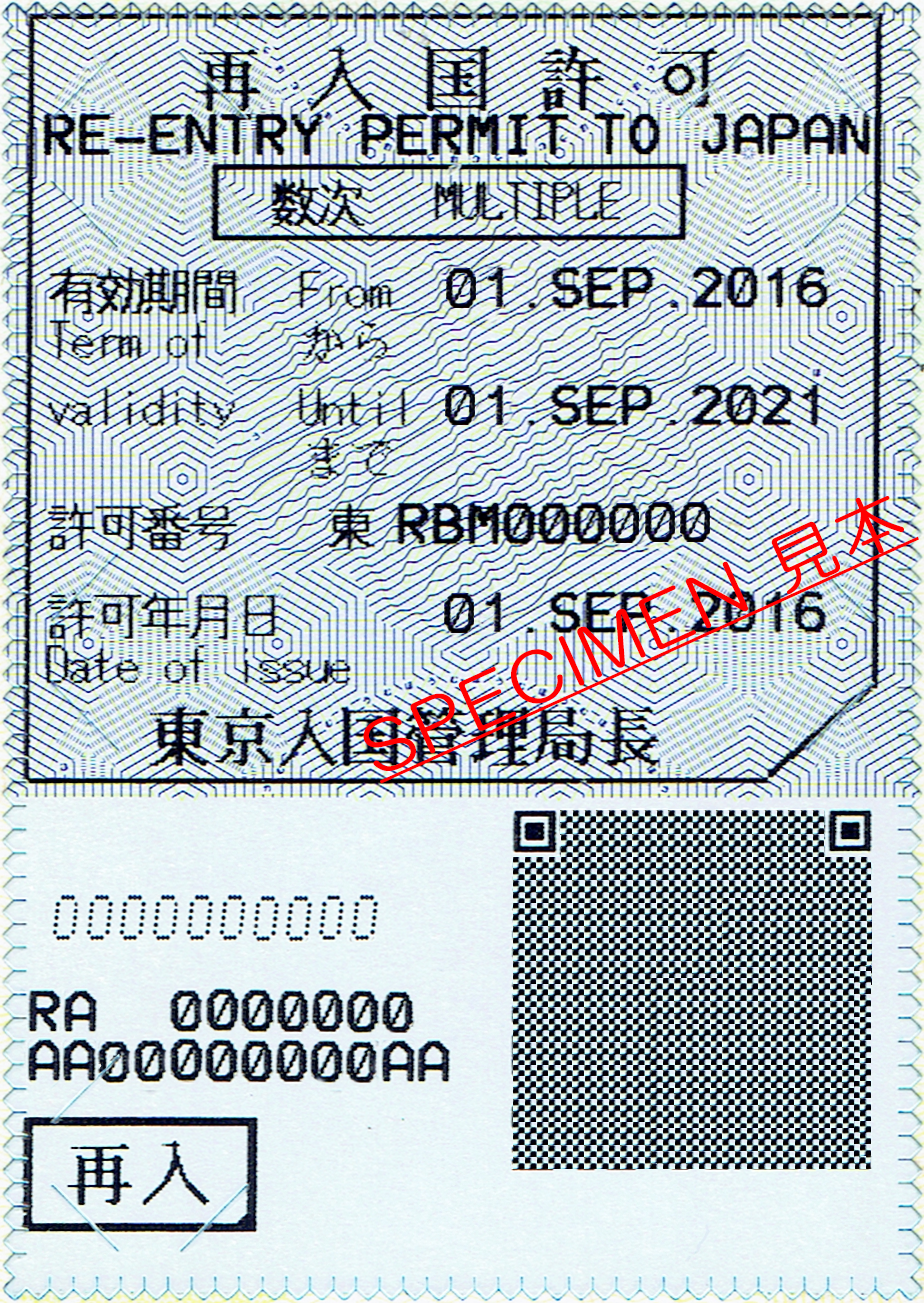
A Re-entry Permit Stamp (sticker type)

The re-entry permit in Japan also exists in the form of a stamp, known as Japan Re-entry Permit (再入国許可), which is affixed to a foreign passport or other travel document and serves as a re-entry visa.

Foreign nationals planning to travel outside Japan for more than one year are required to obtain a re-entry permit. Typically, this permit is applied to the passport as a self-adhesive sticker.

For individuals without a valid passport, a booklet-type re-entry permit is issued concurrently with the re-entry permit stamp.

As of the new system introduced in July 2012, the maximum period for a re-entry permit is six years.

=== Special Re-entry Permit ===
From July 9, 2012, foreign nationals legally residing in Japan who plan to leave the country for no more than one year are no longer required to apply for a re-entry permit before their departure. Instead, they can obtain a special re-entry permit at their point of departure. Previously, if a foreign national left Japan without a re-entry permit, their visa or legal residency status could be revoked.

However, the special re-entry permit system has specific exceptions. It does not apply to individuals whose resident status is in the process of revocation, those whose confirmation of departure is suspended, individuals who have received a written detention order, those who are in the process of applying for refugee status and staying with the resident status of "Designated Activities," or individuals specified by Japan's Ministry of Justice as threats to national interests or public order. Additionally, this permit is deemed necessary for the fair control of entries and departures.

The special re-entry permit is not available for holders of booklet-type re-entry permits. These individuals must have a stamp-type re-entry permit in their booklets since the validity of the booklet re-entry permit is limited to the stamp's valid date.

== Travel ban for North Koreans ==
As a result of sanctions against North Korea, entry and transit is refused to North Korea nationals, even if not leaving the aircraft and proceeding by the same flight

== Visa issuance in mainland China ==
Japanese oversea missions in mainland China request all visa applications guaranteed and submitted by authorized travel agencies and do not accept direct submission. Visa applicants should choose travel agencies authorized by different Japanese oversea missions according to their address of household registration or residence card:

- Embassy of Japan, Beijing: areas unmentioned below;
- Consulate-General of Japan, Shanghai: Shanghai, Anhui, Zhejiang, Jiangsu, Jiangxi;
- Consulate-General of Japan, Guangzhou: Guangdong, Hainan, Fujian, Guangxi;
- Consulate-General of Japan, Shenyang: Liaoning (except Dalian), Jilin, Heilongjiang;
- Consular Office of Japan, Dalian: Dalian;
- Consulate-General of Japan, Chongqing: Chongqing, Sichuan, Guizhou, Yunnan;
- Consulate-General of Japan, Qingdao: Shandong.

The qualification of travel agencies to submit visa applications may be suspended or revoked by Japanese overseas missions if their clients violate immigration rules in Japan (such as overstaying or working illegally).

Japanese oversea missions in mainland China provide following types of individual tourism visa:

Visa specifications	Conditions for applicants (choose one and submit corresponding proof)
Validity: 3 months; Number of entry: single; Duration of stay: 15 days; Medium: electronic; Fee^{*}: CN¥715	Have a certain level of financial capability (at least CN¥100,000 yearly income and/or enough assets); Hold a credit card with gold or higher class; Be a family member of person who meets conditions mentioned above; Be a current or graduated (less than 3 years) full-time undergraduate or postgraduate student in a college in mainland China.
Validity: 3 years; Number of entry: multiple; Duration of stay: 30 days; Medium: sticker; Fee^{*}: CN¥1,430	Have a sufficient level of financial capability (at least CN¥200,000 yearly income and/or enough assets); Have a certain level of financial capability (at least CN¥100,000 yearly income and/or enough assets), and accommodate in Aomori, Iwate, Miyagi, Akita, Yamagata or Fukushima for at least one night during the first trip after new visa being issued; Have a certain level of financial capability (at least CN¥100,000 yearly income and/or enough assets), visited Japan in recent 3 years, and accommodate in Okinawa for at least one night during the first trip after new visa being issued; Be a family member of person who meets conditions mentioned above; Visited Japan at least twice in recent 3 years with individual tourism visas issued in mainland China, visits with tourism visas for college students do not count.
Validity: 5 years; Number of entry: multiple; Duration of stay: 90 days; Medium: sticker; Fee^{*}: CN¥1,430	Have a substantially high income (at least CN¥500,000 yearly income and/or enough assets); Be a family member of person who meets conditions mentioned above.

_{* - Visa fee is directly collected by Japanese oversea missions, service fee collected by travel agencies is not included.}

== See also ==
- Visa requirements for Japanese citizens
