= Masato Kitera =

Japanese diplomat (born 1952)

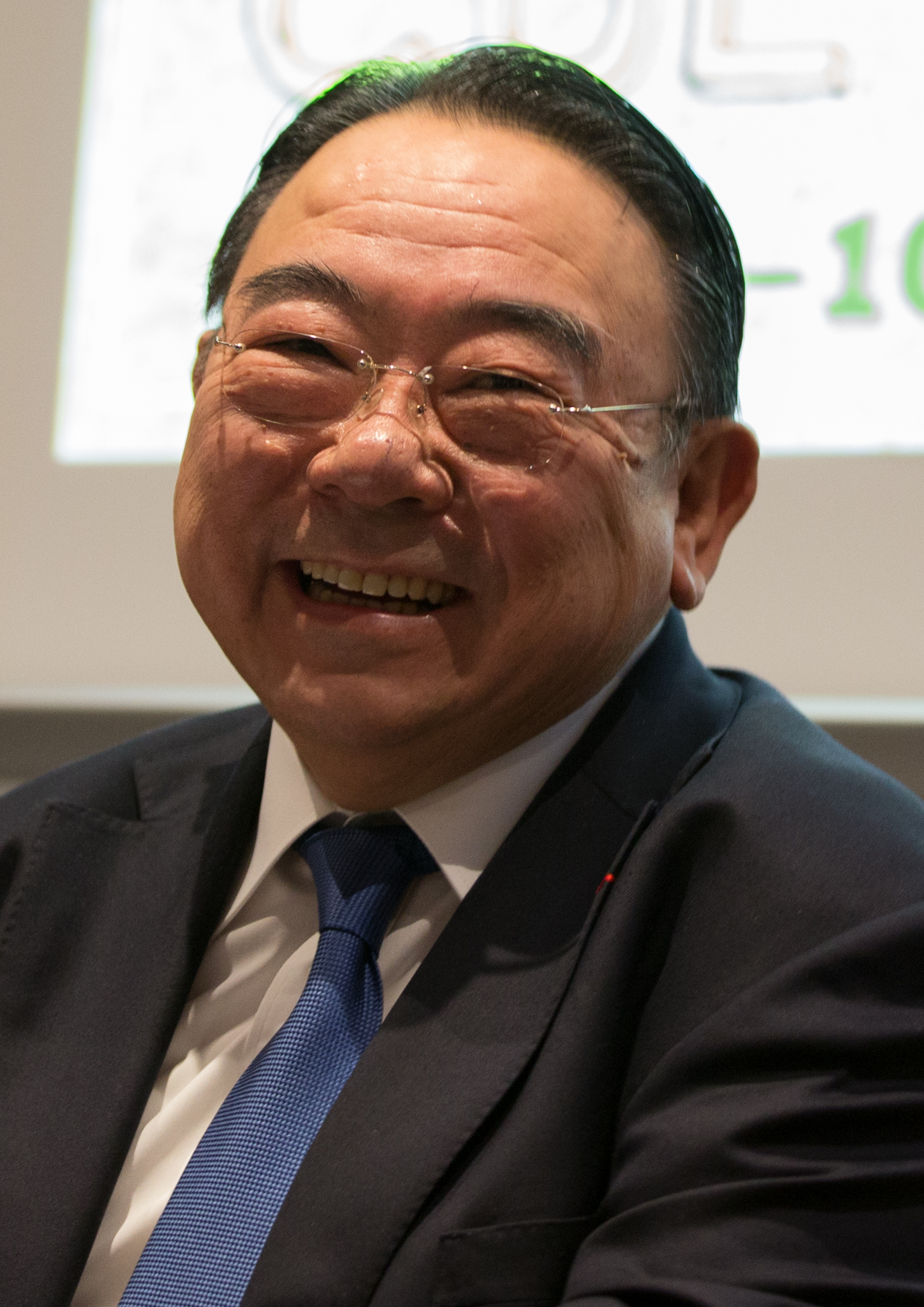
Jun'ichi Ihara in 2017

Masato Kitera (木寺 昌人, Kitera Masato; born 10 October 1952) is a Japanese diplomat who served as ambassador to France from 2016 to 2019 and ambassador to China from 2013 to 2016.

Born in Tokyo on 10 October 1952, he studied law at the University of Tokyo and joined the Ministry of Foreign Affairs after graduating in 1976. He served as director for African affairs, chief of the International Cooperation Bureau and chief secretary in the ministry. He also briefly served as Assistant Chief Cabinet Secretary for foreign affairs, before being appointed ambassador to China in 2012, to replace Shinichi Nishimiya, who had died soon after his appointment. Kitera left the post and was appointed Ambassador to France in 2016, serving until 2019.

After retiring from public service, Kitera has served on the board of Marubeni, Nippon Steel and Japan Tobacco.

Diplomatic posts
Preceded by Yoichi Suzuki	Japanese Ambassador to France; 2016–2019	Succeeded by Junichi Ihara
Preceded by Shinichi Nishimiya	Japanese Ambassador to China; 2012–2016	Succeeded by Yutaka Yokoi
