= List of ambassadors of Japan to China =

Ambassador of Japan to the People's Republic of China
- Japanese: 在中華人民共和国日本国大使; Chinese: 日本驻华大使
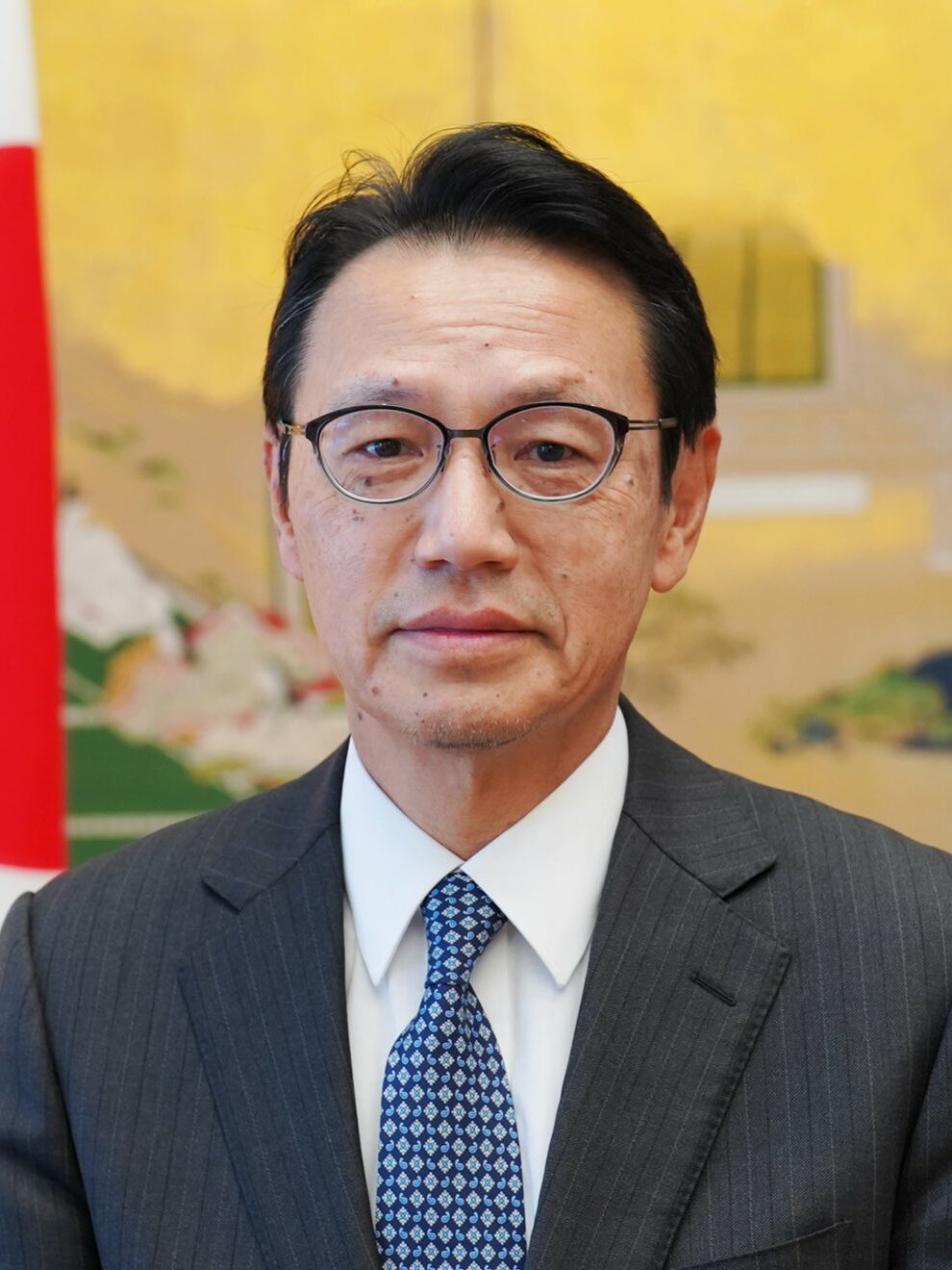
- Incumbent; Kenji Kanasugi since 19 December 2023
- Appointer: Prime Minister
- Inaugural holder: Heishiro Ogawa
- Formation: 3 April 1973
- Website: Embassy of Japan in China

The Ambassador of Japan to the People's Republic of China is an officer of the Japanese Ministry of Foreign Affairs and the head of the Embassy of Japan to China.

== List of representatives ==
This is a chronological list of Japanese diplomats.

=== Japanese Ambassador to the People's Republic of China ===
From September 25 to September 30, 1972, Japanese Prime Minister Kakuei Tanaka visited the People 's Republic of China at the invitation of Premier Zhou Enlai. On September 29, 1972, the Government of the People's Republic of China and the Government of Japan issued a joint statement, and both sides decided to normalize diplomatic relations from that date. In January 1973, the Japanese Embassy in China was established, and in February, the Chinese Embassy in Japan was established. In March, Chen Chu, the first Chinese Ambassador to Japan, and Heishiro Ogawa, the first Japanese Ambassador to China, both took office.

Name	Appointment	Arrival	Credentials presented	Left office	Ref.
Yuichi Hayashi (as chargé d'affaires)		January 10, 1973		March 1973	
Heishiro Ogawa	February 8, 1973	March 31, 1973	April 3, 1973	July 4, 1977	
Shoji Sato		August 10, 1977	August 22, 1977	May 1979	
Kenzo Yoshida		June 15, 1979	June 20, 1979	October 1981	
Yasue Katori		October 1981	October 24, 1981	July 1984	
Yosuke Nakae		August 4, 1984	August 11, 1984	October 1987	
Toshijiro Nakajima		November 10, 1987	November 17, 1987	September 1989	
Osamu Hashimoto		November 1, 1989	November 9, 1989	November 1992	
Michihiko Kunihiro		December 28, 1992	March 1, 1993	March 1995	
Yoshiyasu Sato		March 29, 1995	April 8, 1995	May 1998	
Sakutaro Tanino		May 12, 1998	May 15, 1998	March 2001	
Koreshige Anami		March 2, 2001	March 20, 2001	April 1, 2006	
Yuji Miyamoto		April 10, 2006	June 10, 2006	July 21, 2010	
Uichiro Niwa	June 17, 2010	July 31, 2010	September 3, 2010	November 28, 2012	
Shinichi Nishimiya	September 11, 2012	Died before taking office			
Masato Kitera	October 5, 2012	December 25, 2012	January 17, 2013	May 10, 2016	
Yutaka Yokoi	March 25, 2016	May 15, 2016	May 17, 2016	November 15, 2020	
Hideo Tarumi	September 11, 2020	November 25, 2020	April 14, 2021	December 6, 2023	
Kenji Kanesugi		December 19, 2023	January 30, 2024	Incumbent	

== See also ==
- China–Japan relations
