= Shinichi Nishimiya =

Japanese Ambassador to China
- In office September 2012 – 16 September 2012
- Preceded by: Uichiro Niwa
- Succeeded by: Masato Kitera

Personal details
- Born: 1952 Japan
- Died: 16 September 2012 (aged 59–60) Tokyo
- Education: University of Tokyo

Shinichi Nishimiya (西宮 伸一, Nishimiya Shinichi; 1952 – 16 September 2012) was a Japanese diplomat. Nishimiya was appointed as Ambassador of Japan to the People's Republic of China in 2012. However, he died unexpectedly before traveling to China to present his credentials.

Nishimiya studied in the United Kingdom. He was considered one of the leading experts on United States within the Japanese Foreign Ministry. He was well known in U.S. diplomatic and political circles, and was a contributor to programs at the Council on Foreign Relations in New York City.

He served at the Japanese Embassy in Beijing in 2005. In 2007, Nishimiya became the head of the Foreign Ministry's North American Affairs Bureau. He then served as the Japanese Consul-General in New York City before being named a deputy minister in 2010.

Shinichi Nishimiya was appointed as Japan's Ambassador to China in 2012. He was designated to replace outgoing Ambassador Uichiro Niwa, a former chairman of Itochu. Nishimiya's appointment came at a critical time in relations between China and Japan due to an escalation in tensions over the Senkaku Islands dispute and the ongoing 2012 China anti-Japanese demonstrations.

Ambassador Nishimiya collapsed outside of his home shortly after his appointment. He died unexpectedly at a hospital in Tokyo on September 16, 2012, at the age of 60. Japanese Foreign Minister Koichiro Gemba held a press conference to acknowledge the loss of Nishimiya. Gemba noted that it will take time to find a capable replacement for Ambassador to China, especially during the ongoing Senkaku Islands dispute.

His widow Sachiko has served as chief lady-in-waiting to the Empress since 2019.

Diplomatic posts
Preceded by Uichiro Niwa	Japanese Ambassador to China; 2012	Succeeded by Masato Kitera
