= Hideo Tarumi =

Japanese diplomat (born 1961)

His Excellency Hideo Tarumi
- 垂秀夫
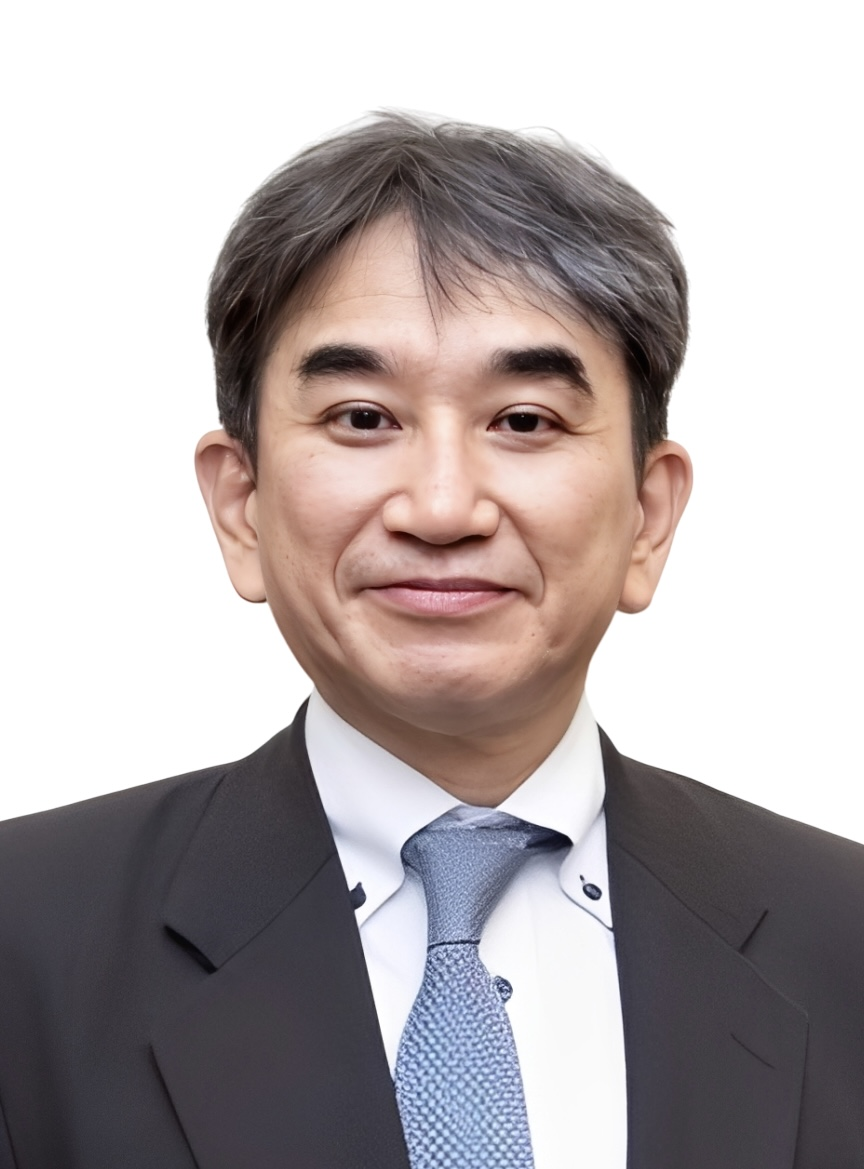
- Official portrait, 2025

Japanese Ambassador to China
- In office November 26, 2020 – December 6, 2023
- Prime Minister: Yoshihide Suga; Fumio Kishida
- Preceded by: Yutaka Yokoi
- Succeeded by: Kenji Kanasugi

Personal details
- Born: May 23, 1961 (age 65) Osaka, Japan
- Education: Kyoto University

Hideo Tarumi (垂秀夫) (born May 23, 1961) is a Japanese diplomat who served as the Ambassador to China, from November 2020 to December 2023.

== Early life ==
Born in Osaka in 1961, Tarumi attended and graduated from Kyoto University's Faculty of Law in March 1985. After graduation, he joined the Ministry of Foreign Affairs after attending Osaka Prefectural Tennoji High School.

== Diplomatic career ==
After joining the Ministry of Foreign Affairs, he studied abroad at Nanjing University in 1986 and at the University of California, San Diego in 1988.

In 1989, he moved to China where he was assigned as First Secretary at the Embassy of Japan in Beijing till 1990. After returning to Japan in 1990, he served in the Second Division of the Cultural Exchange Department and the Economic Cooperation Bureau of the Ministry of Foreign Affairs. In 1994, he was the Chief Secretary of the Research Planning Division of the Economic Cooperation Bureau. In 1995, he returned to work at the Embassy of Japan in China.

In 1999, he moved to Hong Kong where he served as Director of Political Affairs at the Consulate-General of Japan in Hong Kong. From 2001, he served in the Japan–Taiwan Exchange Association office in Taipei, Taiwan.

In 2003, he was assigned as the Planning Officer and Director of the Japan-Korea Economic Coordination Office, Northeast Asia Division, Asian and Oceania Affairs Bureau. In 2004, he served International Intelligence Officer with the Intelligence and Analysis Service within the Third International Information Office and in Asia-Oceania Bureau from February 2007. In August 2008, he was the Chief of the Southeast Asia Division one of Southern Asia Department of the State Bureau, and the Chief of the China and Mongolia Division in the Asian and Oceania Affairs Bureau. In September 2011, he returned to the Embassy of Japan in Beijing, where he served as a political minister.

From 2013, he served as Secretariat, Secretariat of General Affairs Division Manager and Secretariat Deputy Director of Minister of Foreign Affairs, and its Asia-Pacific and South Asia Department. In August 2016, he served in the Japan–Taiwan Exchange Association office in Taipei till March 2017. Tarumi was appointed Director of the Consular Section of the Ministry of Foreign Affairs on July 20, 2018, and was appointed Director of the Minister's Secretariat of the Ministry of Foreign Affairs on July 2, 2019.

=== Ambassador to China ===
On July 15, 2020, it was reported that Tarumi would be appointed as the Ambassador to China, succeeding Yutaka Yokoi. Tarumi arrived in Beijing on November 26, but due to the COVID-19 pandemic, he was required to stay in two weeks of quarantine. On April 14, 2021, President of China Xi Jinping accepted Tarumi's credentials at the Great Hall of the People. His tenure as ambassador ended on December 6, 2023.

The Chinese government has accused Tarumi, alongside Chinese journalist Dong Yuyu, of belonging to an espionage organization due to Dong's support for political reforms.

== Honors ==
- Grand Cordon of the Order of Brilliant Star (2024)

Diplomatic posts
| Preceded by Yutaka Yokoi | Japanese Ambassador to China; 2020–2023 | Succeeded by Kenji Kanasugi |
