= Heishiro Ogawa =

Japanese diplomat

- 小川 平四郎

1st Japan Ambassador to China
- In office March 31, 1973 – July 4, 1977
- Preceded by: Yuichi Hayashi (as chargé d'affaires)
- Succeeded by: Shoji Sato

6th Japan Ambassador to Denmark
- In office November 13, 1968 – January 11, 1972
- Preceded by: Kenichi Otabe
- Succeeded by: Hiroshi Hitomi

Personal details
- Born: March 17, 1916 Chiyoda-ku, Tokyo, Empire of Japan
- Died: July 25, 1997 (aged 81) Tokyo, Japan
- Cause of death: Heart attack
- Parent: Heikichi Ogawa (father)
- Relatives: Brothers: Ippei Ogawa, Heiji Ogawa
- Education: Tokyo Imperial University (1942)
- Occupation: Diplomat

Heishiro Ogawa (小川 平四郎, Ogawa Heishirō; March 17, 1916 – July 25, 1997) was a Japanese diplomat and served as first Japanese Ambassador to the People's Republic of China as diplomatic relations between them were established in 1972.

== Career ==
Ogawa entered the Ministry of Foreign Affairs in 1939, and was immediately stationed to Beijing as a researcher. In 1940, Ogawa audited at the Fu Jen Catholic University after one year of Chinese language studying.

In 1968, Ogawa was appointed the sixth ambassador of Japan to Denmark. In March 1973, Ogawa was appointed the first ambassador of Japan to the People's Republic of China.

== Family ==
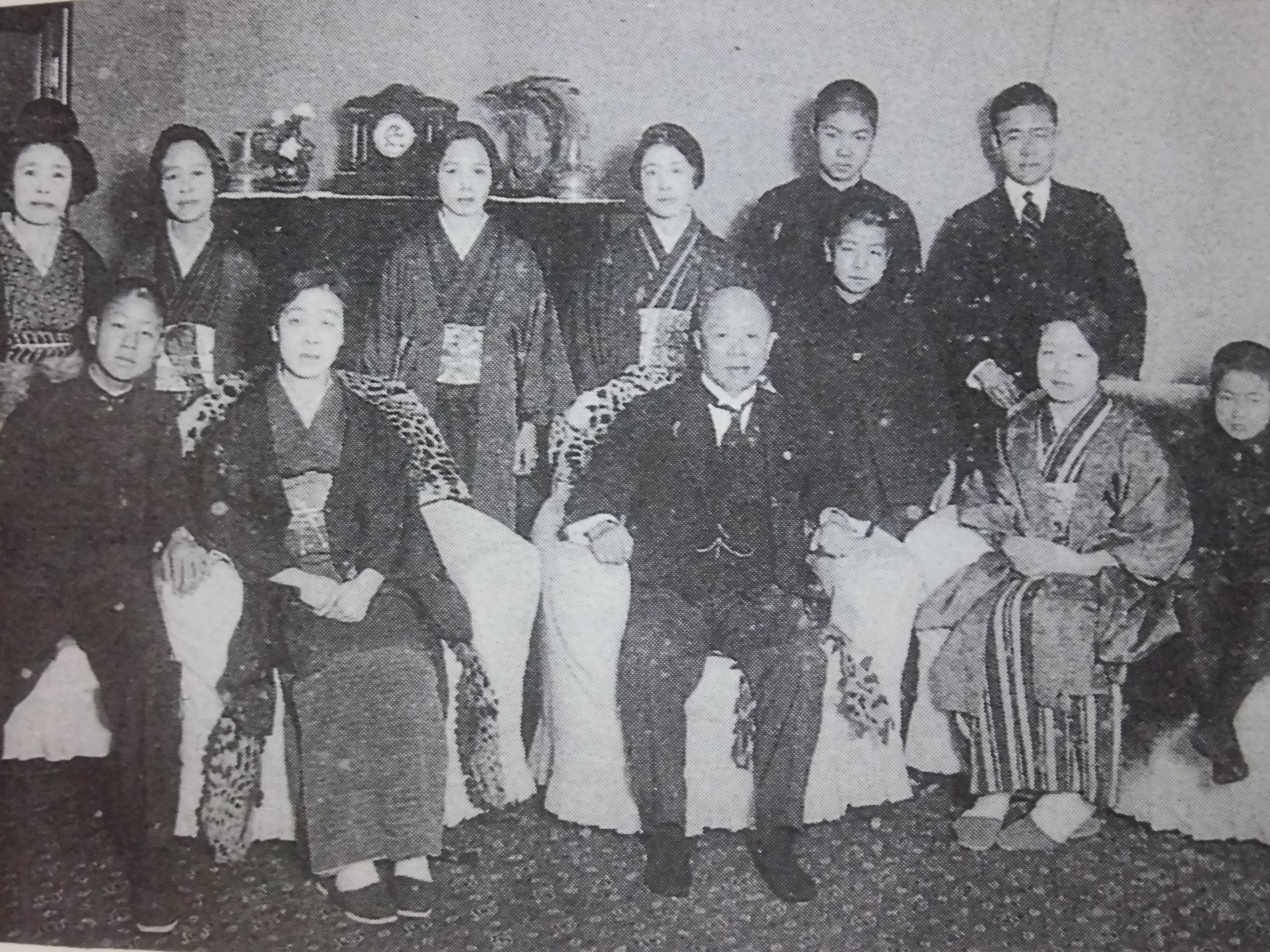
Heikichi Ogawa family

Heishiro Ogawa was the fourth son of Heikichi Ogawa, who served as the Minister of Justice and the Minister of Railways of Japan in the 1920s.
