= Junichi Ihara =

Japanese diplomat (born 1956)

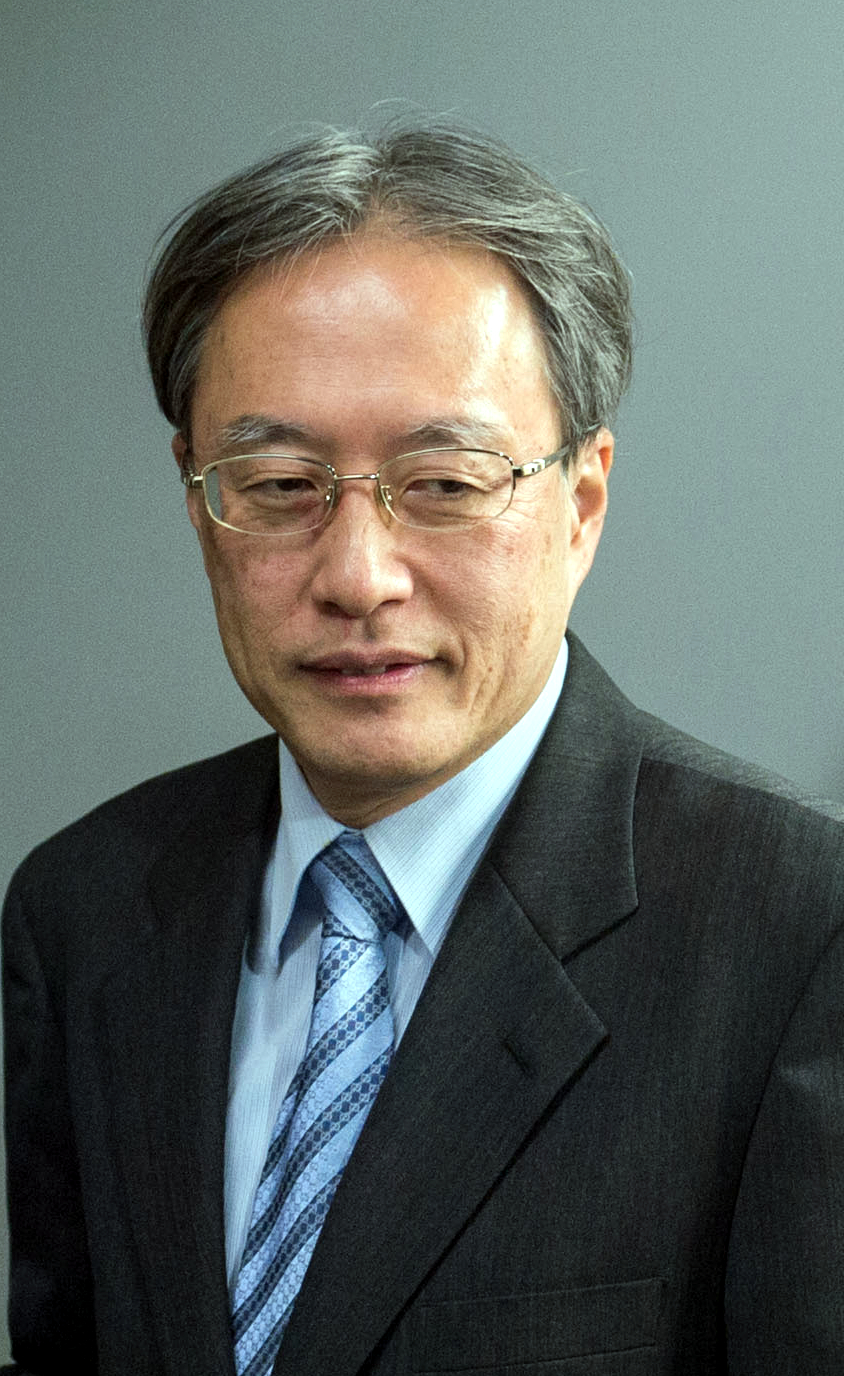
Jun'ichi Ihara in 2013

Junichi Ihara (伊原 純一, Ihara Jun'ichi, born 18 April 1956) is a Japanese diplomat who served as Grand Master of Ceremonies for the Imperial Household from 2023 to 2026. He previously served as Ambassador to France and as Permanent Representative to the International Organizations in Geneva.

== Biography ==
Ihara was born on 18 April 1956. He grew up in Kyoto and studied law at Kyoto University. After graduating in 1979, he joined the Ministry of Foreign Affairs. After joining he was assigned to France for four years to receive French language training. During that period he once accompanied Crown Prince Akihito as an interpreter during a tour of African states for a week.

Ihara then worked in the internal bureaux of the Ministry for eight years, and was working in the North American Bureau at the time of the Gulf War. He was then assigned as first secretary to the Embassy in the Philippines. After returning to Japan, he served as secretary to the Administrative Vice Minister and was involved in the response to the Japanese embassy hostage crisis in 1996. Later he was successively in charge of GATT and WTO, served as minister to the Embassy in the United States and handled response to the North Korean abductions of Japanese citizens.

He was appointed Consul General in Los Angeles in 2008. In 2011 he returned to Japan to serve as chief of the North American Bureau, and of the Asian and Oceanian Affairs Bureau from 2013. In April 2015, he was appointed Permanent Representative of Japan to the International Organizations in Geneva, and while serving as such Ihara held the Chair of the WTODSB in 2017, and the Chair of the General Council of the World Trade Organization in 2019. He was selected on 7 March 2018.

In December 2019, Ihara was appointed Ambassador Extraordinary and Plenipotentiary of Japan to France. He served in this position until October 2022, when he retired from the Ministry. In March of the following year he was appointed Grand Master of Ceremonies. He stepped down in January 2026.

Diplomatic posts
| Preceded by Yōichi Otabe | Permanent Representative to the International Organizations in Geneva; 2015–2019 | Succeeded by Kazuyuki Yamazaki |
| Preceded by Masato Kitera | Japanese Ambassador to France; 2019–2022 | Succeeded by Makita Shimokawa |
Court offices
| Preceded by Yoshitaka Akimoto | Grand Master of Ceremonies; 2023–2026 | Succeeded by Masahiro Mikami |
