= Kenji Kanasugi =

Japanese diplomat to the People's Republic of China (born 1959)

- 金杉憲治
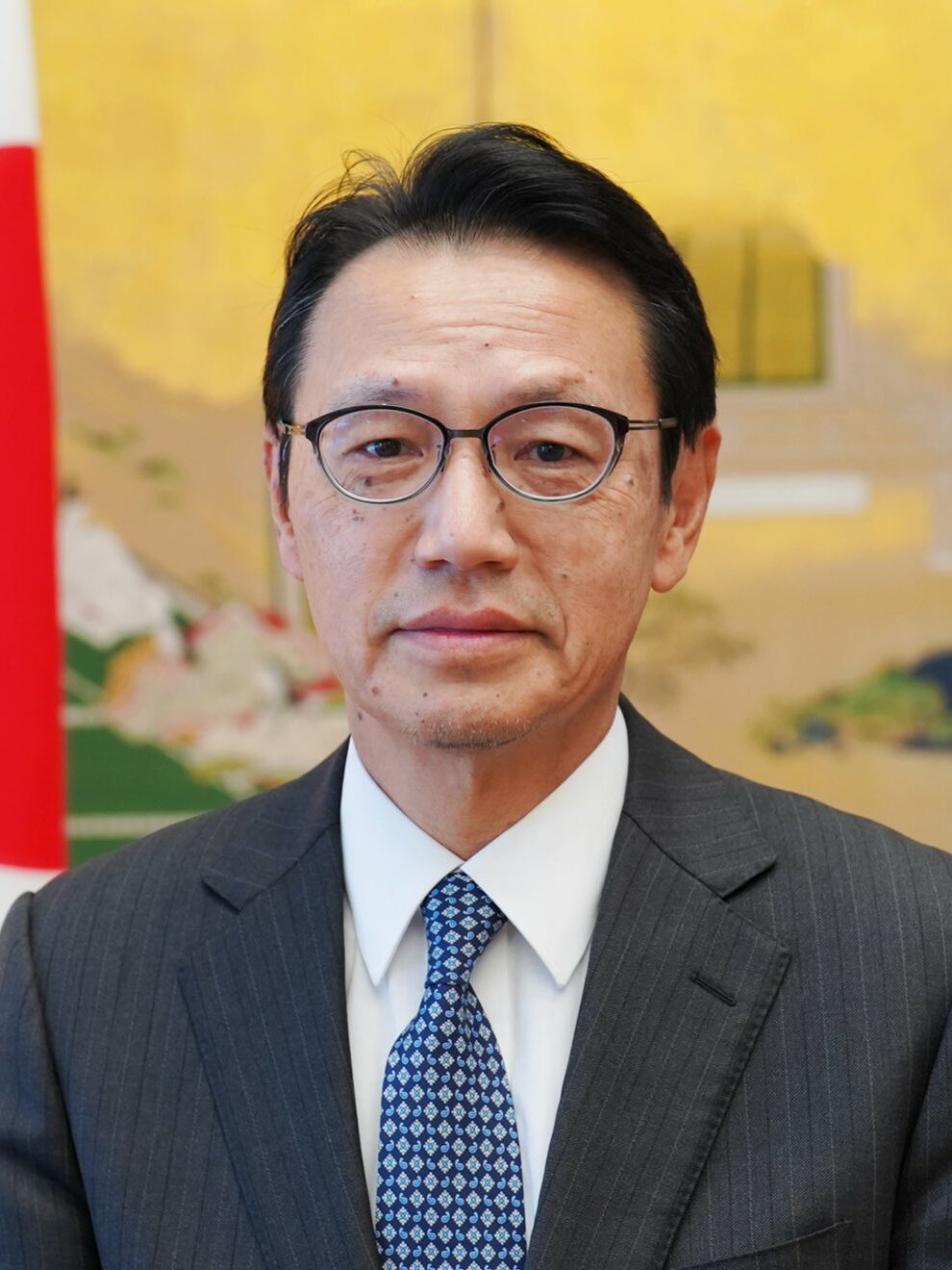
- Kanasugi in December 2023

Japanese Ambassador to China
- Incumbent
- Assumed office December 19, 2023
- Preceded by: Hideo Tarumi

Personal details
- Born: September 11, 1959 (age 67) Toshima, Tokyo, Japan
- Education: Hitotsubashi University

Kenji Kanasugi (金杉 憲治, Kanasugi Kenji; born September 11, 1959) is the current Japanese ambassador to China. He is known for his extensive contributions to Japan's foreign relations in East Asia, particularly with China and the broader Asia–Pacific region. Joining Japan's Ministry of Foreign Affairs in 1983, he has held numerous significant roles in Japanese government and foreign affairs throughout his career.

Kanasugi's expertise spans both economic and regional diplomacy. Notable positions he has held include Director-General of the Economic Affairs Bureau and the Asian and Oceanian Affairs Bureau. His work involved managing key international relations, such as coordinating meetings between Japanese and Chinese leaders, including then-Prime Minister Shinzo Abe and Chinese president Xi Jinping. Additionally, Kanasugi served as a Senior Deputy Minister for Foreign Affairs in charge of economic issues, emphasizing his focus on economic diplomacy.

In 2020, Kanasugi became Japan's ambassador to Indonesia, where he worked on strengthening bilateral ties and addressing regional challenges. In October 2023, he was appointed Japan's ambassador to China. This marked a strategic move as he became the first ambassador in seven years outside the “China School” (a group of diplomats with specialized training in Chinese language and affairs). His appointment reflects Japan's intent to manage sensitive issues with China, such as maritime territorial disputes and economic tensions, through pragmatic and diplomatic approaches.

Kanasugi's tenure as ambassador to China focuses on critical issues, including addressing Beijing's concerns about Japan's wastewater release from the Fukushima nuclear plant. He emphasizes the need for calm, science-based dialogue to resolve conflicts and stabilize Japan-China relations.

== Early life ==
Kanasugi was born in 1959 in Tokyo's Toshima Ward. He graduated from the Faculty of Law of Hitotsubashi University in 1983 and entered the Ministry of Foreign Affairs the same year.

== Diplomatic career ==
=== Ministry of Foreign Affairs ===
Kenji Kanasugi has built a career in Japan's Ministry of Foreign Affairs (MOFA). His work involved addressing trade policies and promoting international economic cooperation.

As Director-General of the Asian and Oceanian Affairs Bureau, he played a pivotal role in managing Japan's relations within the Asia-Pacific, particularly during a time of heightened tensions with neighboring countries. He facilitated high-level meetings between Japanese and Chinese leaders, contributing to stabilizing the often volatile Japan-China relationship. In his capacity as Senior Deputy Minister for Foreign Affairs in charge of economic issues, Kanasugi combined his expertise in regional and economic affairs to advocate for Japan's interests in international economic policies.

=== Ambassador to Indonesia ===
Kanasugi's tenure as Japan's ambassador to Indonesia from October 2020 until November 2023 highlighted his ability to foster bilateral relations in Southeast Asia. He worked on reinforcing economic ties, enhancing people-to-people connections, and addressing regional issues like maritime security.

=== Ambassador to China ===
Appointed in October 2023, Kanasugi became Japan's ambassador to China, a critical role amid strained relations due to disputes over territorial waters, trade policies, and detained Japanese nationals. His appointment marked a strategic shift, being the first ambassador in seven years outside the “China School.”

=== Korean relations ===
He has also served as the diplomatic and economic director of the Japanese embassy in South Korea, building many relationships with the Ministry of Foreign Affairs of the Republic of Korea. He was called the chairman of the 'Korea School' within the Ministry of Foreign Affairs and served in Korean affairs.
