= Uichiro Niwa =

Japanese diplomat (1939–2025)

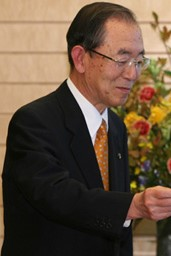

Japanese Ambassador to China
- In office 2010–2012
- Preceded by: Yuji Miyamoto
- Succeeded by: Shinichi Nishimiya

Personal details
- Born: January 29, 1939 Nagoya, Japan
- Died: December 24, 2025 (aged 86)
- Education: Nagoya University

Uichiro Niwa (丹羽 宇一郎, Niwa Uichirō; January 29, 1939 – December 24, 2025) was a Japanese diplomat and businessman who served as the Ambassador of Japan to the People's Republic of China, president and chairman of Itochu Corporation, and chairman of the Society of Global Business (SGB).

== Business career ==
Niwa joined Itochu Corporation in 1962 after graduating from Nagoya University.

He became president of Itochu in 1998, at the age of 61. At the time, Itochu was suffering significant losses from the collapse of the Japanese asset price bubble. Niwa cut 300 unprofitable businesses and held an initial public offering of Itochu's IT subsidiary Itochu Techno-Solutions in order to raise cash. He established a team called "Net Valley" to grow Itochu's investments in the internet, satellite and broadcasting industries.

== Assignment to Japan-Turkey Society Chairman ==
From 2008, Niwa served as the Chairman of the Japan-Turkey Society, established in 1926, until becoming its special advisor in 2010.

== Ambassador to China ==
Niwa became ambassador to China in July 2010. His appointment was unusual as it was rare for a businessperson to hold the position.

=== Handling of Senkaku and Diaoyu Islands Incident ===
On September 18, 2012, the Japanese government of Yoshihiko Noda nationalized the Senkaku Islands. The Noda government chose to nationalize the islands just one week after the anniversary of the 1931 Mukden Incident, which served as a pretext for the Imperial Japanese Army to invade northeastern China, which became a step leading up to the Pacific War. It was Imperial Japan's efforts to invade and colonize other Asian countries that eventually led to the deterioration of diplomatic relations between Japan and the U.S. in the years leading up to the Pacific War. In the decades leading up to the war, the United States and many private American citizens fervently defended China as a victim of aggression perpetrated by the Empire of Japan. In light of this background, the Noda government's choice to nationalize the islands so close to the anniversary could be interpreted as an attempt to create a direct link between present-day Japan and the Japanese Empire. Since any needlessly provocative actions by the Japanese government could draw the United States into a war with another nuclear power, Noda's action could be seen as needlessly threatening U.S. security, given the fact that the United States has pledged to defend Japan against attack under the Treaty of Mutual Cooperation and Security between the United States and Japan.

Prior to Noda's move, the Japanese government consulted with the United States. However, according to former U.S. Assistant Secretary for East Asian and Pacific Affairs Kurt Campbell (Kyodo News/Japan Times, April 10, 2013), the United States warned Noda not to nationalize the islands. It was in this context that Japanese ambassador to China Uichiro Niwa also warned the Noda government that the nationalization would gravely harm Sino-Japanese relations and potentially endanger peace in North Asia. On June 12, 2012, for example, Ambassador Niwa told the Financial Times "If [Tokyo Governor Shintaro] Ishihara’s plans [to buy the islands] are acted upon, then it will result in an extremely grave crisis in relations between Japan and China. We cannot allow decades of past effort to be brought to nothing." He was then severely criticized by Ishihara, who called for Niwa to be fired. Foreign Minister Koichiro Genba subsequently announced that Niwa had apologized to him in a private letter. Genba shortly thereafter recalled Niwa as Japan's Ambassador to China.

Ishihara's actions and Prime Minister Noda's subsequent nationalization of the islands led to large scale anti-Japan demonstrations in 2012 and a grave crisis in diplomatic relations between Japan and China, proving that the fears of the United States and Niwa had been well founded. In an interview with the Asahi Shimbun published on December 28, 2012, Niwa nevertheless stressed his view that the Senkaku Islands are part of Japanese territory, saying that, "The Senkaku Islands are Japanese territory. We should not concede even an inch." But in the same interview the ambassador stated that, "Having worked for a company, my thinking was to work on behalf of the nation, society and people. Pursuing only the interests of one's own company will, in the long run, not lead to the development of society. Profits and a company's brand can only be constructed by thinking from a wider perspective." He also stated that "When a governor speaks or acts in a manner that can affect national interests, the prime minister should say, 'You should keep quiet. That is a task for the central government.' What would happen to Japan's governing structure if other prefectural governors took a similar action as the Tokyo governor?"

== Death ==
Niwa died on December 24, 2025, at the age of 86.

== Honours ==
- Honorary Doctoral Degree from Shiga University in 2010

Diplomatic posts
Preceded by Yuji Miyamoto	Japanese Ambassador to China; 2010–2012	Succeeded by Shinichi Nishimiya
