= Hu Zhengyue =

Chinese civil servant

Hu Zhengyue (simplified Chinese: 胡正跃; traditional Chinese: 胡正躍; pinyin: Hú Zhèngyuè, born 1953 in Zhejiang Province) is a Chinese civil servant who served as Assistant Minister of Foreign Affairs of the People's Republic of China between 2008 and 2011. Hu leads delegations to countries in Asia.

Hu also served as the Ambassador Extraordinary and Plenipotentiary of the PRC to Malaysia between 2001 and 2003.
