= Embassy of Japan, Beijing =

Embassy of Japan in Beijing Japanese: 在中華人民共和国日本国大使館 Chinese: 日本駐華大使館
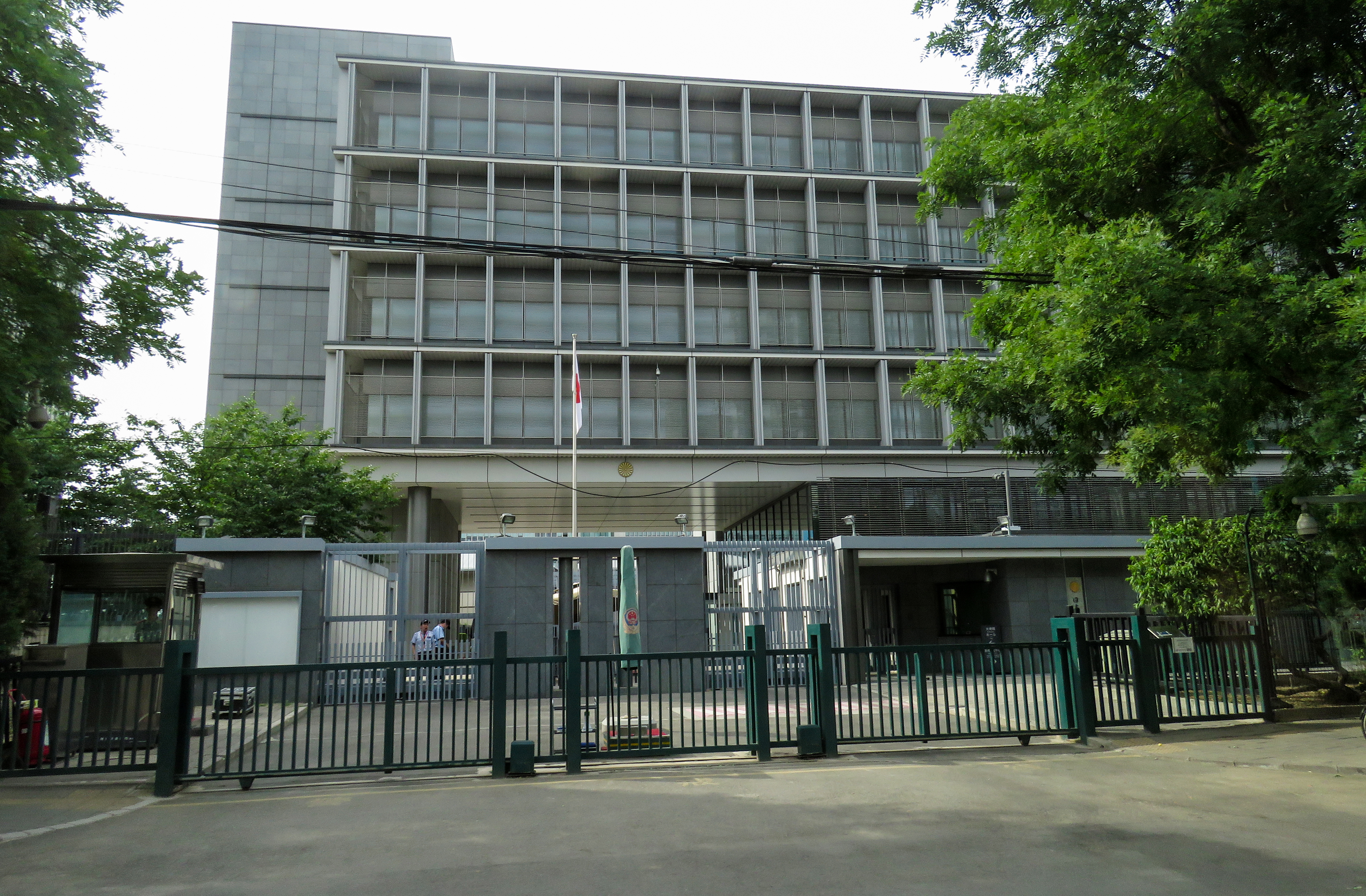
- Location: Chaoyang District, Beijing, China
- Address: 1 E. Liangmaqiao St., Chaoyang District, Beijing
- Coordinates: 39°57′13″N 116°28′19″E
- Ambassador: Kenji Kanasugi
- Website: www.cn.emb-japan.go.jp/itprtop_zh/index.html

The Embassy of Japan in Beijing (Japanese: 在中華人民共和国日本国大使館 ; Chinese: 日本駐華大使館) is the official diplomatic mission of Japan to the People's Republic of China. It is located at Beijing's Chaoyang District, and was officially opened in January 1973. The current ambassador is Kenji Kanasugi.

== Location ==
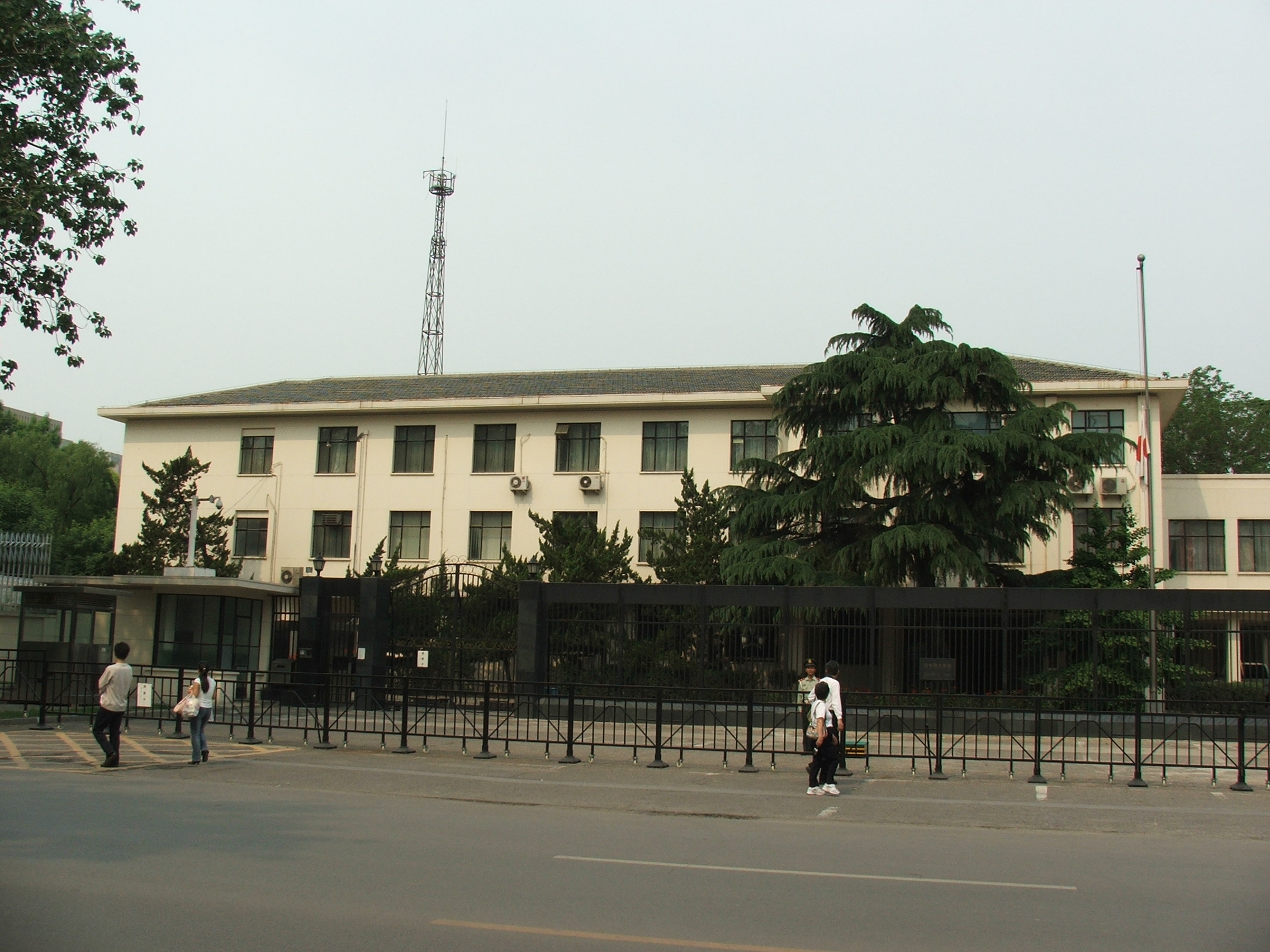
The former building of the embassy

The current location for the embassy has a total of seven stories. The building began construction in September 2006, and was officially completed in August 2011. The building has been used as an embassy since March 2012.

The former location of the embassy officially closed down in late February 2012.

== See also ==
- China-Japan Relations
- Embassy of China, Tokyo
- List of diplomatic missions of Japan
- List of diplomatic missions in China
