= China–Japan relations =

- China: Japan

Diplomatic mission
- Embassy of China, Tokyo: Embassy of Japan, Beijing

Envoy
- Ambassador Wu Jianghao: Ambassador Kenji Kanasugi

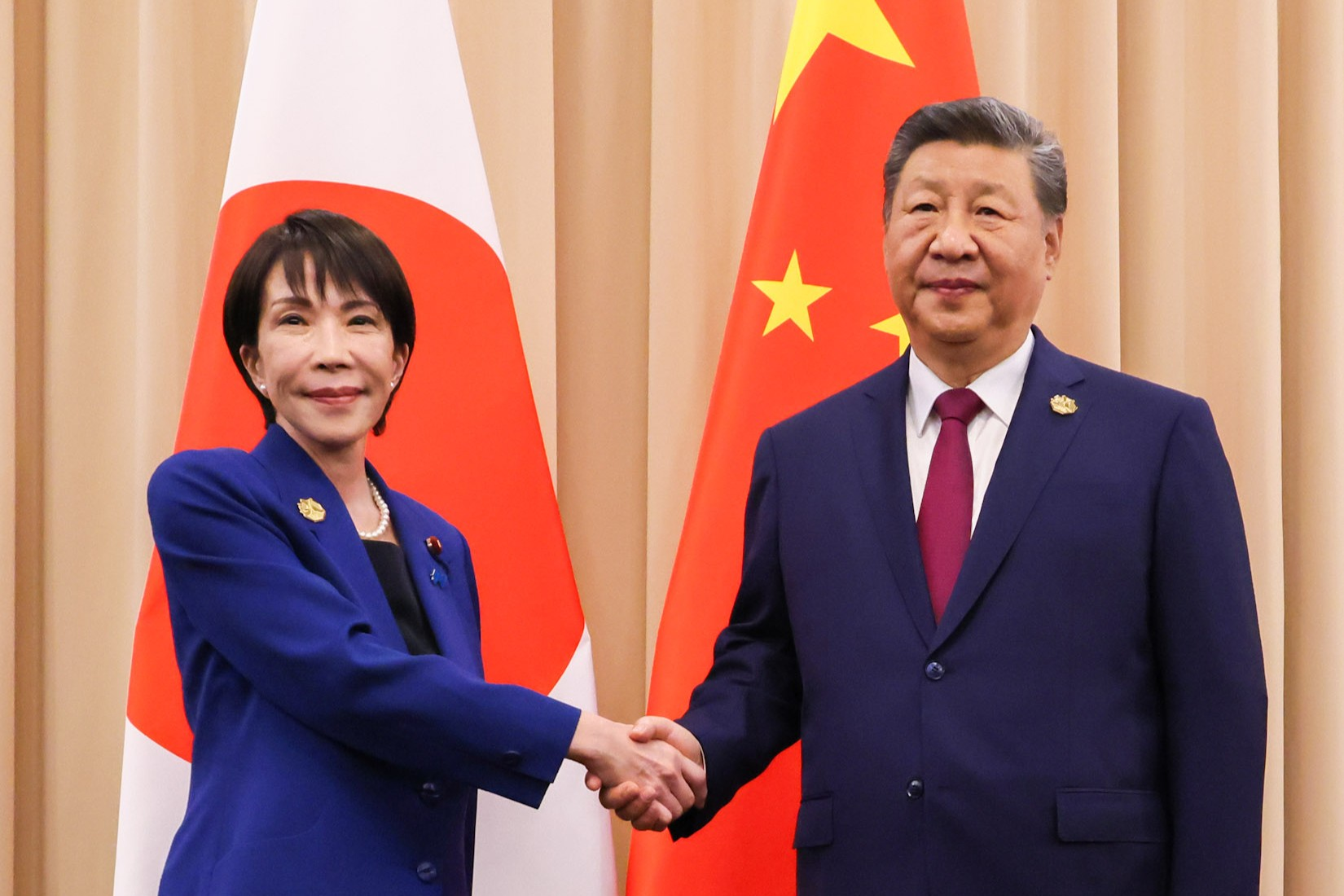
Japanese Prime Minister Sanae Takaichi with Chinese Leader Xi Jinping during the APEC South Korea 2025, 31 October 2025

The relationship between China and Japan spans thousands of years. Japan has deep historical and cultural ties with China; cultural contacts throughout its history have strongly influenced Japan—including its writing system, architecture, cuisine, culture, literature, religion, philosophy, and law. China, in return, has been deeply influenced by Japan. After the Meiji Restoration in 1868, the Empire of Japan embraced Westernization and saw the Qing dynasty as "non-Chinese", leading to the First Sino-Japanese War where Japan emerged victorious and gained control of Taiwan. In the 20th century, Japan pursued an increasingly expansionist policy towards China. In 1931, Japan invaded Manchuria, establishing the puppet state of Manchukuo, and invaded other parts of China in 1937, precipitating the Second Sino-Japanese War which was marked by numerous Japanese war crimes. Japan surrendered in 1945, leading China to regain all lost territories. After the establishment of the People's Republic of China in 1949, relations were tense, with Japan continuing to recognize the Republic of China which had retreated to Taiwan, though informal ties with the PRC existed.

Japan normalized relations with the PRC in 1972 with the Japan–China Joint Communiqué, recognizing PRC as the only legitimate representative of China. The Treaty of Peace and Friendship between Japan and China was signed in 1978. During this time, trade between the two nations grew significantly. Relations further improved when Emperor Akihito visited China in 1992 and Prime Minister Tomiichi Murayama issued a statement in 1995 apologizing for Japan's actions during World War II. Ties between the two nations deteriorated after anti-Japanese demonstrations in 2005. The 21st century marked a changing balance of power between the two countries; Japan's economy stagnated following the Lost Decades that started in the 1990s, while China's economic and military power grew significantly after the beginning of reform and opening up in 1978. In 2010, China's economy overtook Japan's. Relations deteriorated in 2012, triggered by the Japanese government's purchase of the disputed Senkaku Islands from their private owner, which led to anti-Japanese protests. Relations started to improve in the late 2010s and early 2020s, but deteriorated in 2025 and 2026 after comments made by Prime Minister Sanae Takaichi regarding a potential defense of Taiwan.

In contemporary times, China and Japan are among the world's largest economies and major trading partners, with bilateral trade reaching $322 billion in 2025; China has been Japan's largest trading partner since 2005. China is the largest source of tourists and foreign students to Japan. Despite strong economic ties, relations are strained due to geopolitical disputes, wartime history, and the dispute about the Senkaku (Diaoyu) Islands, which are administered by Japan but claimed by China. Additionally, Japan's security concerns over Taiwan, controversies over Japan's wartime actions including the Nanjing Massacre and Unit 731, visits by Japanese politicians to the Yasukuni Shrine, and differing historical narratives continue to fuel tensions. Public opinion surveys show that overwhelming majority of people in both countries have negative views of each other. While efforts have been made to improve relations, longstanding disagreements remain.

== History ==
=== Background ===
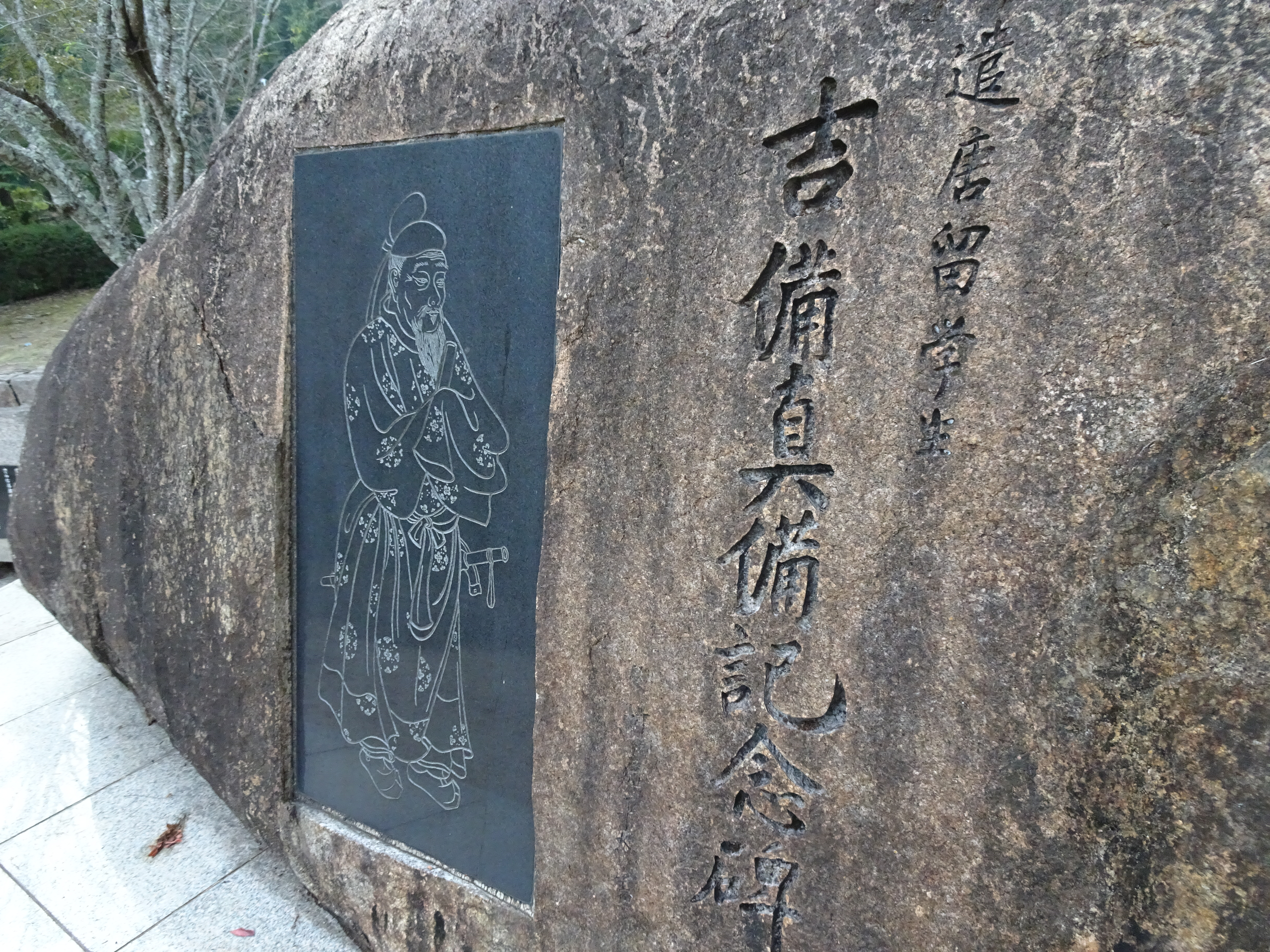
Monument dedicated to Kibi no Makibi, Japanese diplomat who lived in China for 17 years.

China and Japan are geographically separated only by a relatively narrow stretch of ocean. China has strongly influenced Japan with its writing system, architecture, culture, religion, philosophy, and law. For a long time, there was trade and cultural contacts between the Japanese court and the Chinese nobility.

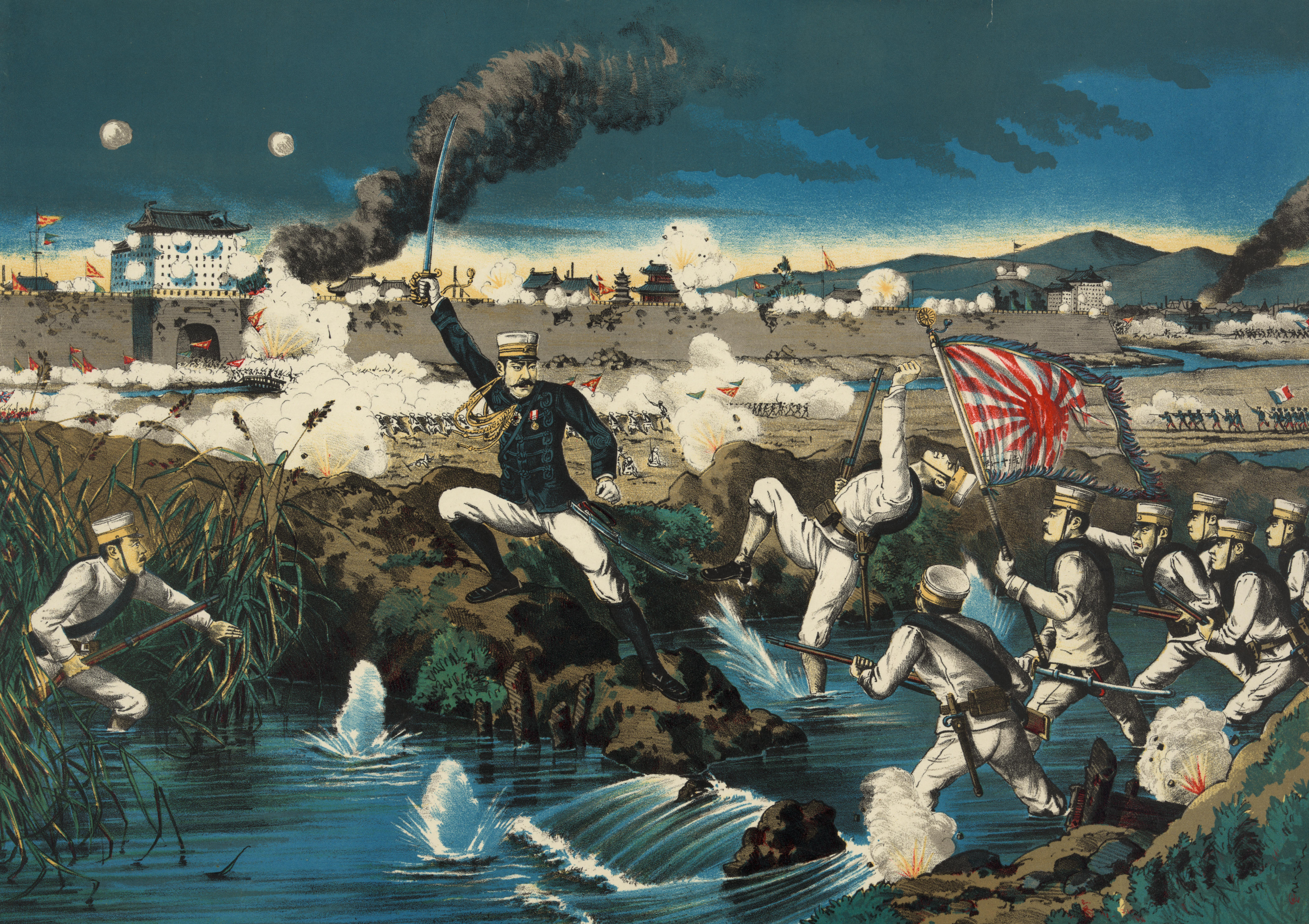
The Japanese army launches a general offensive on Tianjin castle during the Boxer Rebellion, 1900.

When Western countries forced Japan to open trading in the mid-19th century, Japan moved towards modernization (Meiji Restoration). The Empire of Japan viewed the Qing dynasty as an antiquated, backwards civilization, unable to defend itself against Western forces in part due to the First and Second Opium Wars along with the Eight-Nation Alliance's involvement in suppressing the Boxer Rebellion.

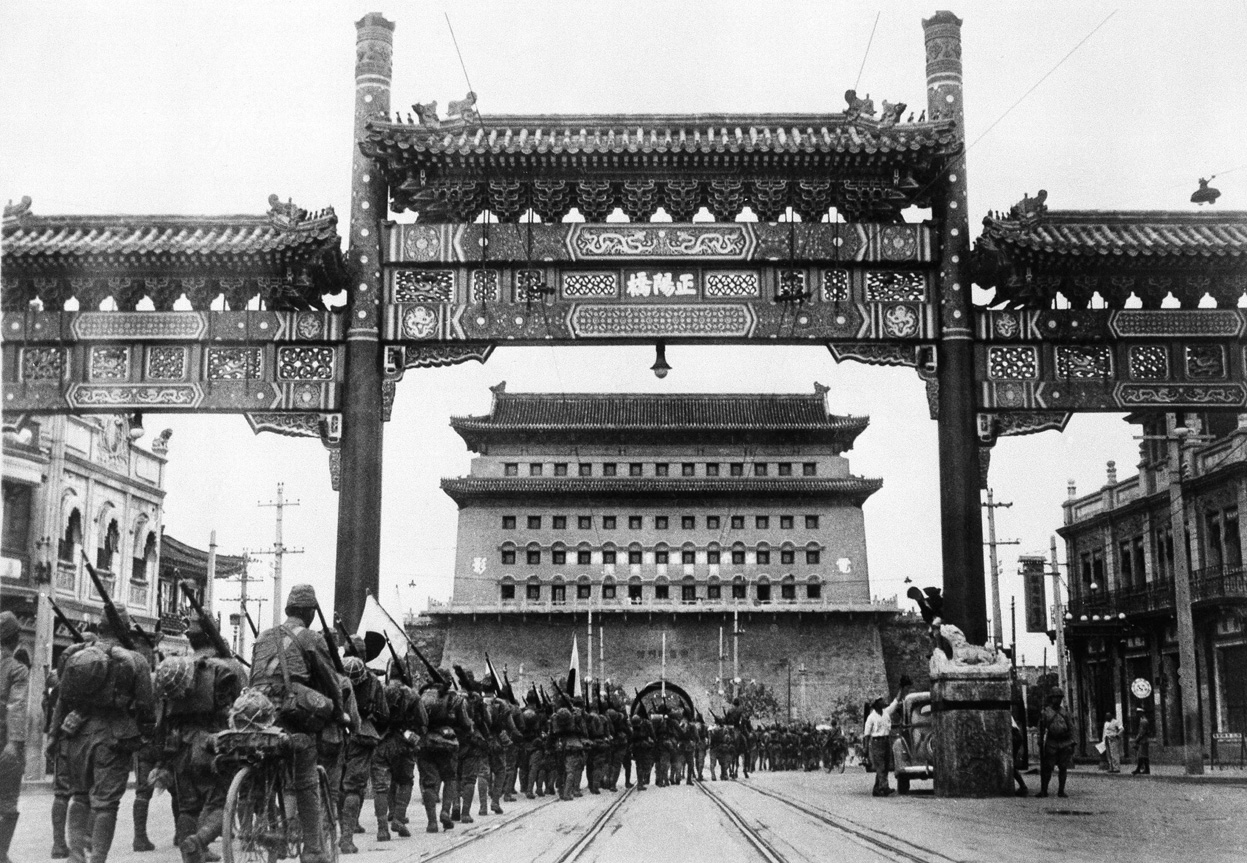
Japanese march into Zhengyangmen of Beijing after capturing the city in July 1937

During the Second Sino-Japanese War (1937–1945), the Chinese Communist Party (CCP) officially engaged in a "United Front" with the Nationalists (KMT) against Japan, but primarily utilized the period to expand its forces, military strength, and territorial control through guerrilla warfare. While engaging in selected, often limited battles, the CCP largely focused on behind-the-lines organization to prepare for post-war power struggles with Chiang Kai-shek's Nationalist forces. Mao Zedong viewed the conflict as a way to weaken the KMT while strengthening the CCP's position for the inevitable civil war, which eventually came after the surrender of Japan in 1945 and ended with the CCP's victory in 1949 on mainland China.

As a result of Japanese war crimes during the Second Sino-Japanese War such as the Nanjing massacre and the Chinese view that Japan has not taken full responsibility for them, the bilateral relationship between China and Japan continues to be a sensitive issue in China.

=== After the establishment of the People's Republic of China ===
Between 1949 and 1972, Japan–China relations were characterized as cold, with Japan heavily constrained by the U.S.–Japan security alliance, which mandated maintaining relations with Taipei (Taiwan) over Beijing. Despite this, private trade and cultural ties persisted under a "separation of politics and economics" (seikei bunri) policy, culminating in its normalization in 1972 following the U.S. rapprochement with China.

Meanwhile, during this period, socialist parties in Japan maintained ties with the ruling Chinese Communist Party. As the primary opposition to the ruling Liberal Democratic Party (LDP) for decades, the Japanese Socialist Party (JSP) was known for its "neutralist" foreign policy and frequently sent delegations to China to build ties, often serving as a conduit for people-to-people diplomacy before the 1972 normalization. Meanwhile, anti-communist sentiment was running high in Japan, with ultranationalist conservatives outraged by these contacts, particularly with JSP leader Inejirō Asanuma for having portrayed the U.S. as Japan's main enemy during his trip to Communist China, eventually resulting in his assassination in October 1960.

In 1964, Mao Zedong issued a Statement Expressing the Chinese People's Support for the Japanese People's Great Patriotic Struggle.

In 1964, the Japanese government began allowing its citizens to visit the PRC. The next year, Japan became the single largest source of inbound tourists to the PRC.

=== Normalization ===
In December 1971, the Chinese and Japanese trade liaison offices began to discuss the possibility of restoring diplomatic trade relations, and in July 1972, Kakuei Tanaka succeeded Eisaku Satō as the new Japanese Prime Minister. Tanaka assumed a normalization of the Sino–Japanese relations. Furthermore, the 1972 Nixon visit to China encouraged the normalization process. The normalization process was eased in part because PRC and Japan had maintained unofficial trade and people-to-people exchanges.

A visit by Tanaka to Beijing culminated in the signing the Japan–China Joint Communiqué on September 29, 1972, which normalized diplomatic relations between Japan and the PRC. Japan stated that it was aware of its responsibility for causing enormous damage to the Chinese people during World War II and China renounced its demand for war reparation from Japan. Avoiding political disputes over this traumatic history facilitated immediate strategic cooperation. The Japanese acknowledged but did not formally endorsed the Chinese view on the political status of Taiwan, namely "that Taiwan is an inalienable part of the territory of the People's Republic of China."

On 5 February 1973, China and Japan agreed to reestablish diplomatic relations. The Japan–China Friendship Parliamentarians' Union (JCFUP) was created in 1974 as a semi-official platform focused on dialogue and goodwill that acts as a crucial channel for diplomatic relations that promotes cultural exchanges, economic links and political understanding. A cross-party group of Japanese lawmakers, often led by the moderate Buddhist democratic party Kōmeitō would meet with high-level Chinese officials and the CCP's liaison department to smoothen relations and calm occasional political tensions even to the present day.

Negotiations for a Sino-Japanese peace and friendship treaty began in 1974, but soon broken off in September 1975. China insisted the anti-hegemony clause, which was directed at the Soviet Union, be included in the treaty. Japan objected the clause and did not wish to get involved in the Sino-Soviet split. Talks on the peace treaty were resumed in July 1978, and the agreement was reached in August on a compromise version of the anti-hegemony clause. The Treaty of Peace and Friendship between Japan and China was signed on August 12 and came into effect October 23, 1978, under the two leaders of Deng Xiaoping and Takeo Fukuda.

==== 1980s ====
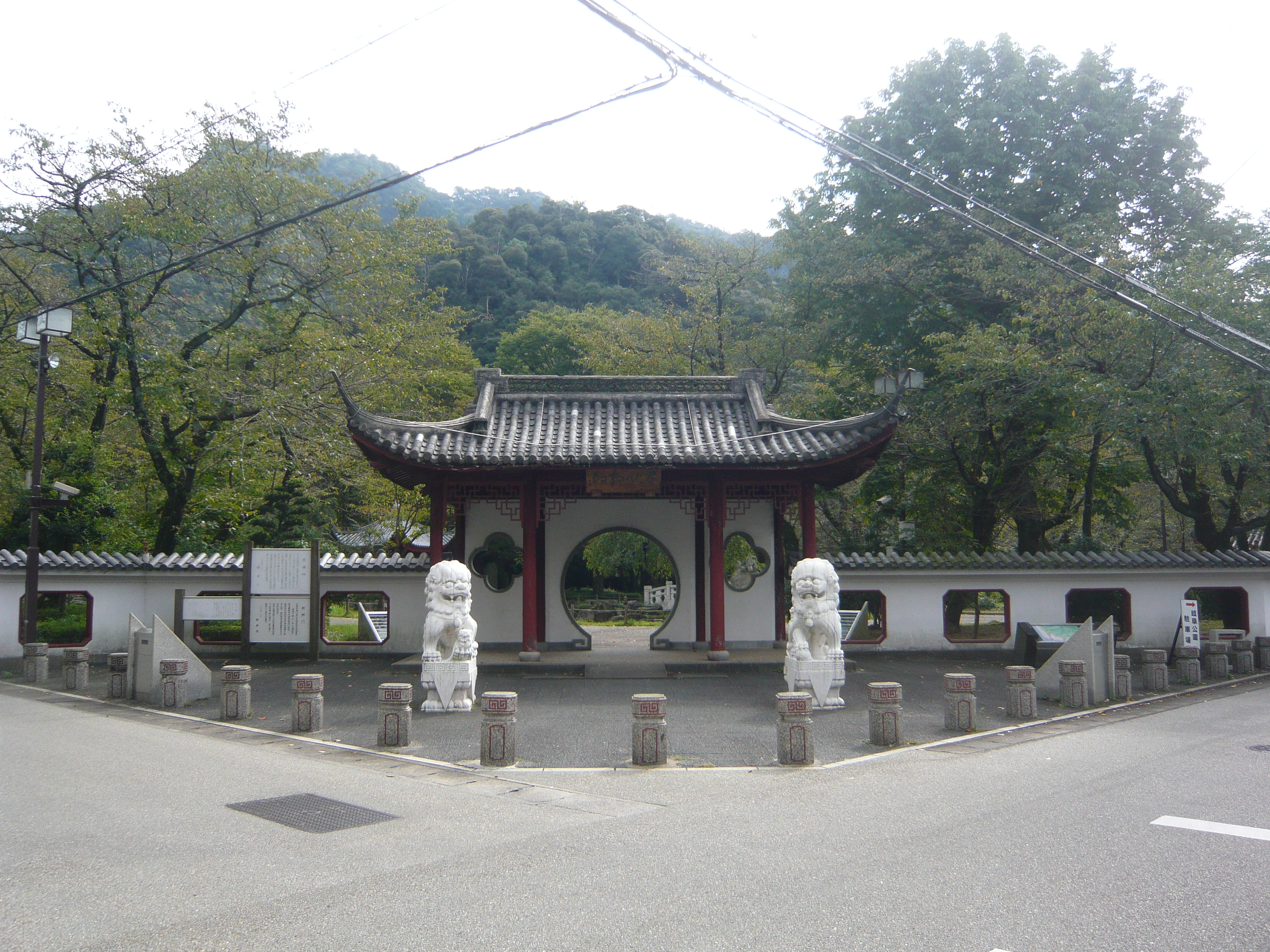
Japan-China Friendship Garden

The 1980s were a high point of China–Japan relations, and Japan pursued a strategy of "Friendship Diplomacy" with China. The General Secretary of the Chinese Communist Party (CCP), Hu Yaobang, visited Japan in November 1983, and Prime Minister Yasuhiro Nakasone reciprocated by visiting China in March 1984.

Economic issues centered on Chinese complaints that the influx of Japanese products into China had produced a serious trade deficit for China. Nakasone and other Japanese leaders tried to relieve above concerns during visits to Beijing and in other talks with Chinese officials. They assured the Chinese of Japan's continued large-scale development and commercial assistance, and to obstruct any Sino-Soviet realignment against Japan. The two countries also concluded a bilateral investment treaty in 1988 after seven years of tough negotiation, where China finally agreed to grant Japanese investments with "national treatment". In the late 1980s, China and Japan began cooperation on environmental matters. After the 1989 Tiananmen Square protests and massacre, Japan called the response "intolerable" and froze loans to China.

==== 1990s ====
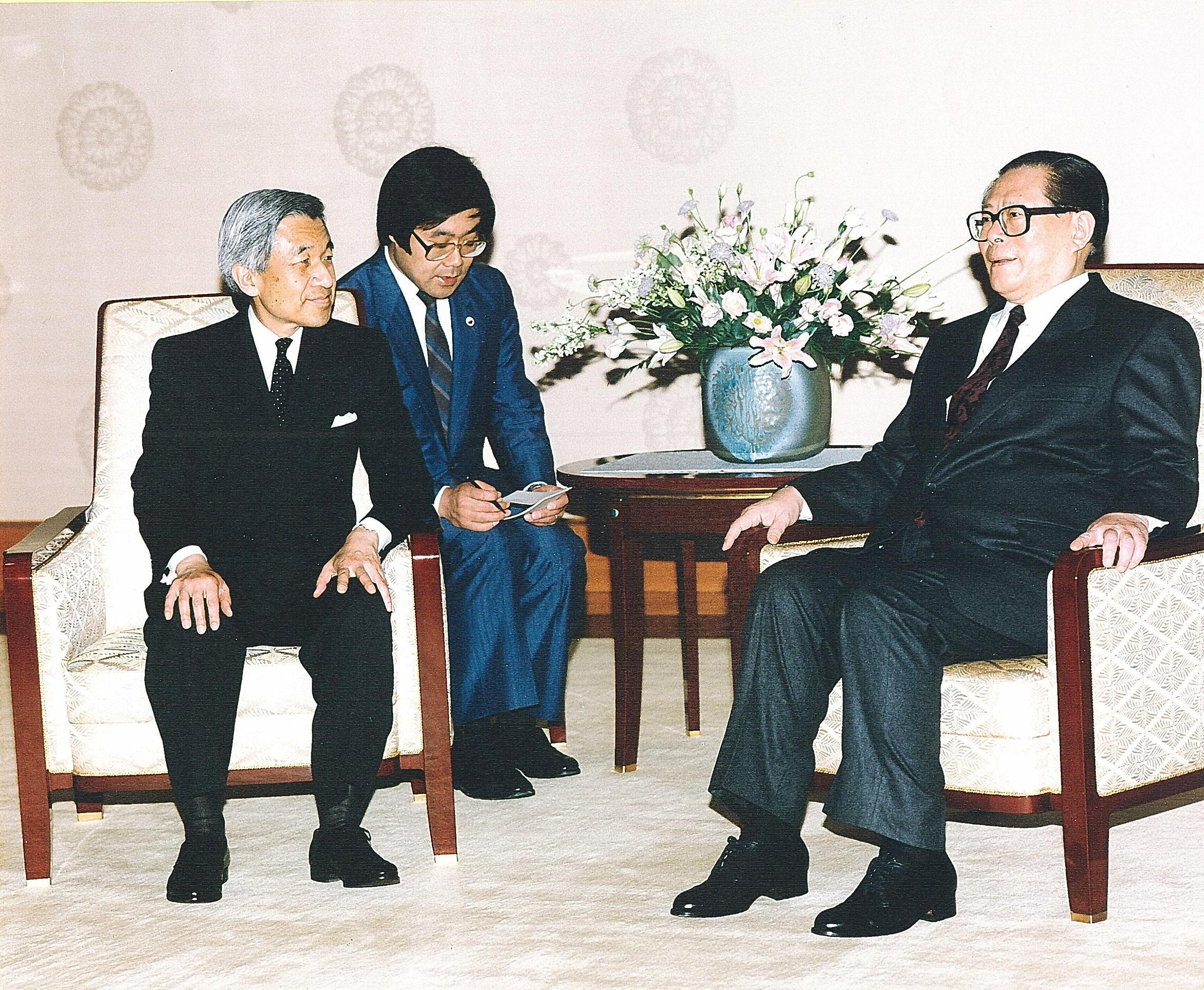
Emperor Akihito and CCP General Secretary Jiang Zemin on 7 April 1992.

In 1990, Japan became the first member of the G7 to restore high level relations with China. On 10 August 1991, Japanese Prime Minister Toshiki Kaifu became the first among major developed Western countries to visit Beijing. On 6 April 1992, General Secretary of the Chinese Communist Party Jiang Zemin visited Japan. In October 1992, Japanese emperor Akihito visited China, the first visit to China by a Japanese emperor. The visit marked a significant improvement in the relationship.

Relations were further improved when Prime Minister Tomiichi Murayama visited China in May 1995, where he visited the Marco Polo Bridge and the Museum of the War of Chinese People's Resistance Against Japanese Aggression, the first Japanese prime minister to do so. He also issued the Murayama Statement in August 1995, in which he apologised for the Japan's actions during World War II, an act that was highly appreciated in China. On 29 August, the Japanese government protested China's nuclear test and announced the freezing of government loan aid to China.

Bilateral structural change developed during the late 1990s to 2004. Japan had been investing in China during the early 1990s, and trade decreased during the late 1990s, but resurged at the millennium. The resurgence might have been because of the prospect of China becoming a part of the World Trade Organization (WTO). China and Japan engaged in moderate bilateral cooperation throughout the 1990s and 2000s. Continuing the bilateral cooperation on environmental matters that began in the late 1980s, the Sino-Japanese Friendship Centre for Environmental Protection was established in 1996. In 1998, Jiang Zemin visited Japan, where the two nations announced a "friendly cooperative partnership dedicated to peace and development".

=== 21st century ===
==== 2000s ====
Japanese Prime Minister Junichiro Koizumi visited Beijing in October 2001, where he visited the Marco Polo Bridge and the Museum of the War of Chinese People's Resistance Against Japanese Aggression, expressing remorse and apology for Japan's history of aggression against China. However, Koizumi later undertook six visits to the Yasukuni Shrine during his six years as Prime Minister of Japan damaging the relationship. Trade increased during this time, leading to the coining of the phrase "cold politics, hot economics".

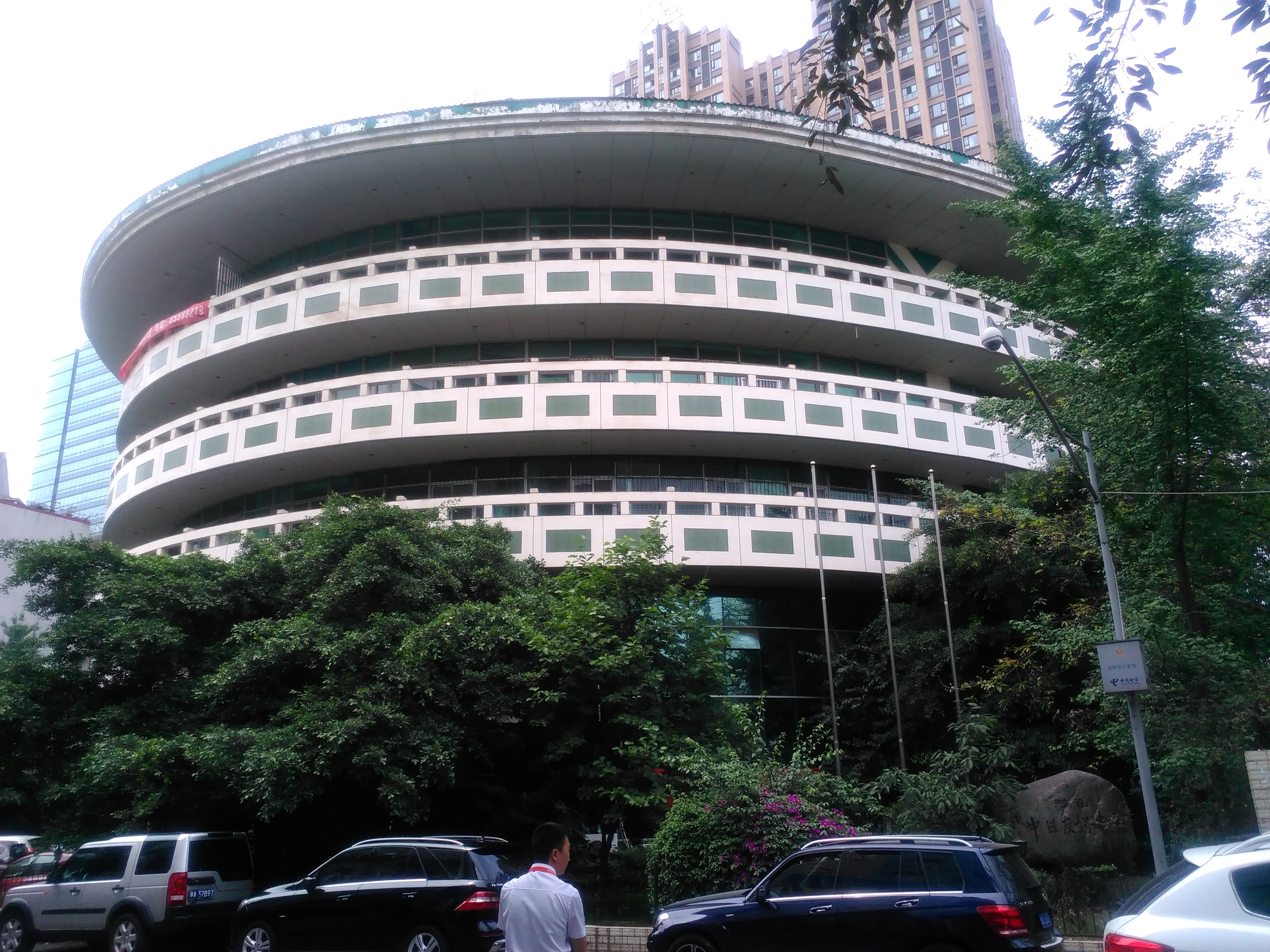
The Hiroshima-Sichuan Sino-Japanese Friendship Convention Center (Japanese: 広島・四川中日友好会館, Simplified Chinese: 广岛・四川中日友好会馆) in Wuhou District, Chengdu

In early 2005, Japan and the United States had issued a joint statement which addresses issues concerning the Taiwan Strait. China was angered by the statement, and protested the interference in its internal affairs. The Anti-Secession Law was passed by the third session of the 10th National People's Congress, and was ratified in March 2005, and then the law went into effect immediately. Subsequently, anti-Japanese demonstrations took place simultaneously in China and other Asian countries.

However, the "warm" relationship between China and Japan had been revived by two Japanese Prime Ministers, Shinzo Abe and particularly Yasuo Fukuda whose father achieved to conclude the Treaty of Peace and Friendship between Japan and China. In May 2008, Hu Jintao was the first General Secretary of the Chinese Communist Party in over a decade to be invited to Japan on an official visit, and called for increased "co-operation" between the two countries. A joint statement by General Secretary Hu Jintao and Japanese Prime Minister Yasuo Fukuda announced a mutually beneficial relationship based on common strategic interests, reading:

"The two sides resolved to face history squarely, advance toward the future, and endeavor with persistence to create a new era of a "mutually beneficial relationship based on common strategic interests" between Japan and China. They announced that they would align Japan–China relations with the trends of international community and together forge a bright future for the Asia-Pacific region and the world while deepening mutual understanding, building mutual trust, and expanding mutually beneficial cooperation between their nations in an ongoing fashion into the future".

In October 2008, Japanese Prime Minister Tarō Asō visited Beijing to celebrate the 30th anniversary of the conclusion of the Treaty of Peace and Friendship between Japan and China. At the reception, he remarked on his "personal conviction regarding Japan-China relations":

"We should not constrain ourselves in the name of friendship between Japan and China. Rather, sound competition and active cooperation will constitute a true "mutually beneficial relationship based on common strategic interests." Confucius said, "At thirty, I stood firm." In the same way, Japan and China must now stand atop the international stage and work to spread to the rest of the world this spirit of benefiting together".

Although Japanese and Chinese policymakers claimed that "ice-breaking" and "ice-melting" occurred in the bilateral relationship between 2006 and 2010, however, none of the fundamental problems related to history and disputed territory had been resolved, and so there was a virtual "ice-berg" under the surface.

Following 2009, the Democratic Party administrations under Yukio Hatoyama and Naoto Kan pursued a "new foreign policy" that drew closer to China and integrated into Asia, leading to progress in the relationship. However, the Democratic Party's domestic and foreign policy blunders, particularly regarding the relocation of US military bases in Okinawa, brought this new foreign policy to an end. By the last Democratic Party administration under Yoshihiko Noda, Japan had renewed serious disagreements with China on historical issues and the Senkaku Islands.

==== 2010s ====
In 2010, China overtook Japan as the world's second-largest economy. In 2012, China's gross GDP was 1.4 times as big as Japan's. In 2011, Chinese foreign ministry spokesman Ma Zhaoxu criticized the annual Japanese defense white paper for its use of the China threat theory.

In August 2012, Hong Kong activists landed on one of the disputed Senkaku (Diaoyu Islands), and Japanese nationalists responded by landing on the island the following week. In September 2012, the Japanese government purchased three of the islets from a private Japanese owner, leading to widespread anti-Japan demonstrations in China. As soon as Japanese government announced Japan's nationalization of the islands in 2012, relations between the two countries broke to a freezing point, which triggered a series of military action by Chinese government as countermeasures. Prime Minister Yoshihiko Noda purchased the islets on behalf of the central government to "pre-empt" Tokyo Governor Shintaro Ishihara's plan to purchase them with Tokyo municipal funds. Ishihara is well known for his provocative nationalist actions, and Noda feared that Ishihara would try to occupy the islands or otherwise use them to provoke China." Relations deteriorated further after the Japanese government purchase of the Senkaku islands, to the extent that China decided to skip IMF meetings held in Japan. Mass protests against Japanese actions occurred in major Chinese cities. Trade relations deteriorated badly during the latter half of 2012 and Chinese government aircraft intruded into disputed airspace for the first time since 1958. China has sent drones to fly near the islands. Japan has threatened to shoot these down, which China has said would be an act of war.

In the early 2010s, bilateral cooperation between China and Japan largely stopped as political tensions ran high.

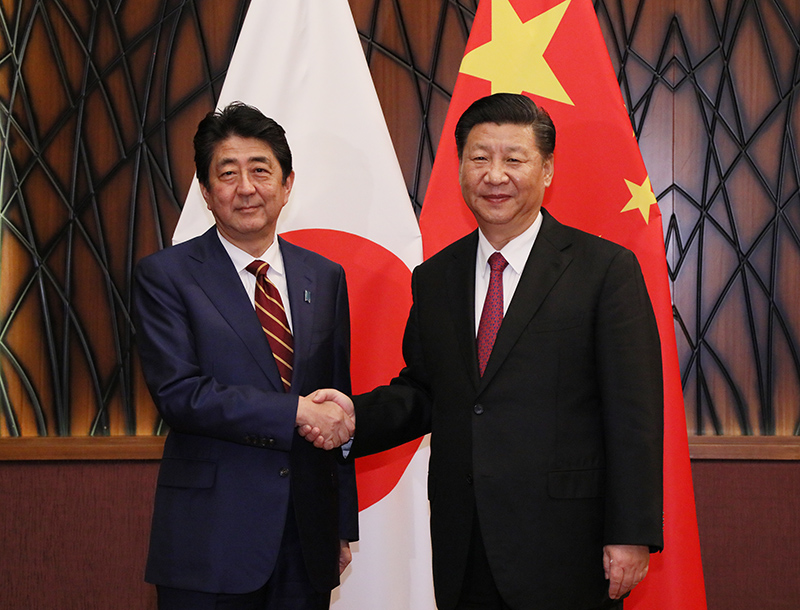
CCP General Secretary Xi Jinping and Japanese Prime Minister Shinzo Abe in November 2017.

After Shinzo Abe came back to power in 2012, he visited the Yasukuni Shrine in 2013, worsening the relationship. Abe strengthened the US-Japan alliance, cooperated with US President Barack Obama's Pivot to Asia policy, and adopted a strategy of containing and deterring China. In its 2013 white paper, Japan called recent Chinese actions "incompatible with international law." The paper also mentioned Operation Dawn Blitz, after China had called for the exercise to be scaled back. The Liberal Democratic Party that he led proposed constitutional revision, and changed the interpretation of the constitution in 2015 through the Legislation for Peace and Security. American reporter Howard French states in 2017:

to turn on the television in China is to be inundated with war-themed movies, which overwhelmingly focus on Japanese villainy. More than 200 anti-Japanese films were produced in 2012 alone, with one scholar calculating that 70% of Chinese TV dramas involved Japan-related war plots....A prominent Chinese foreign-policy thinker who has had extensive contact with the country's leadership told me, "in meetings since Xi has been in power [2012] you could feel the hatred. Everything is about punishing Japan. Punishing this damned [Japanese Prime Minister Shinzo] Abe." The most high-profile action that hurt the bilateral relations would be Japanese Prime Ministers’ visits to Yasukuni Shrine, a place considered by most Chinese nationals as offensive because many WWII Japanese military criminals are worshipped there. China-Japan relations reached to the lowest point since the previous Prime Minister Koizumi's term because of his visit to the shrine. Nonetheless, Prime Minister Abe Shinzo also visited Yasukuni Shrine many times after he got re-elected in 2010, which triggered furious anti-Japanese protests in China due to the negative attitudes and perceptions between the two nations. In a sense, both Koizumi and Abe made “maverick behavior”, in specific making visits to the Yasukuni Shrine as the proof to exhibit nationalism ideology, which endangered the China-Japan relations into the worst phase.

Relations between Japan and China improved in the wake of the China–United States trade war. The improvement has been attributed to strong personal rapport between Shinzo Abe and Xi Jinping, and to Japan's own trade disputes with the United States. Abe advised Xi on trade negotiations with U.S. president Donald Trump. In May 2018, Chinese Premier Li Keqiang visited Japan. From 25 to 27 October 2018, at the invitation of Chinese Premier Li Keqiang, Shinzo Abe paid an official visit to China. A framework for third-party market cooperation was established between the two countries.

==== 2020s ====
Sino-Japanese relations experienced a thaw during the novel coronavirus outbreak. On 15 January 2020, Japan confirmed the first case of novel coronavirus from a man who had traveled to Wuhan. With an ancient line of a poem by a Japanese emperor to a Chinese monk that inspired the latter to spread Buddhism to Japan: "Even though we live in different places, we live under the same sky" being tweeted out by government officials and with the stanza posted on the sides of boxes of face masks sent as aid to China. Japan's private sector has donated over 3 million face masks along with $6.3 million in monetary donation. China's Foreign Minister spokesperson Geng Shuang lauded Japan for their support.

Amidst the spread of COVID-19 pandemic in Japan, China responded in kind by donating 12,500 COVID-19 test kits in aid to Japan after reports that the country was running low on test kits, with a Chinese Foreign Ministry spokesperson saying in Japanese that "China and Japan are neighboring countries separated by only a narrow strip of water. Although there are no borders in fight against the spread of virus." As of 4 June 2021, Japan also donated 1.24 million doses of COVID-19 vaccines to Taiwan. This prompted a wave of gratitude from Taiwanese people, whereas the Chinese foreign ministry condemned Japan's move.

On 2 December 2021, the Chinese Ministry of Foreign Affairs announced that it had summoned Japan's ambassador in Beijing, Hideo Tarumi, over remarks made by former Japanese Prime Minister Shinzo Abe on 1 December 2021 in support of Taiwan. In comments attributed to Chinese Deputy Foreign Minister. Hua Chunying, Beijing said Tokyo's envoy had been summoned over Abe's "irresponsible" remarks which presented a "brutal intervention" in China's internal affairs. On 28 December 2021, both Japan and China agreed to set up a military hotline to defuse potential crises over disputed islands and the Taiwan Strait.

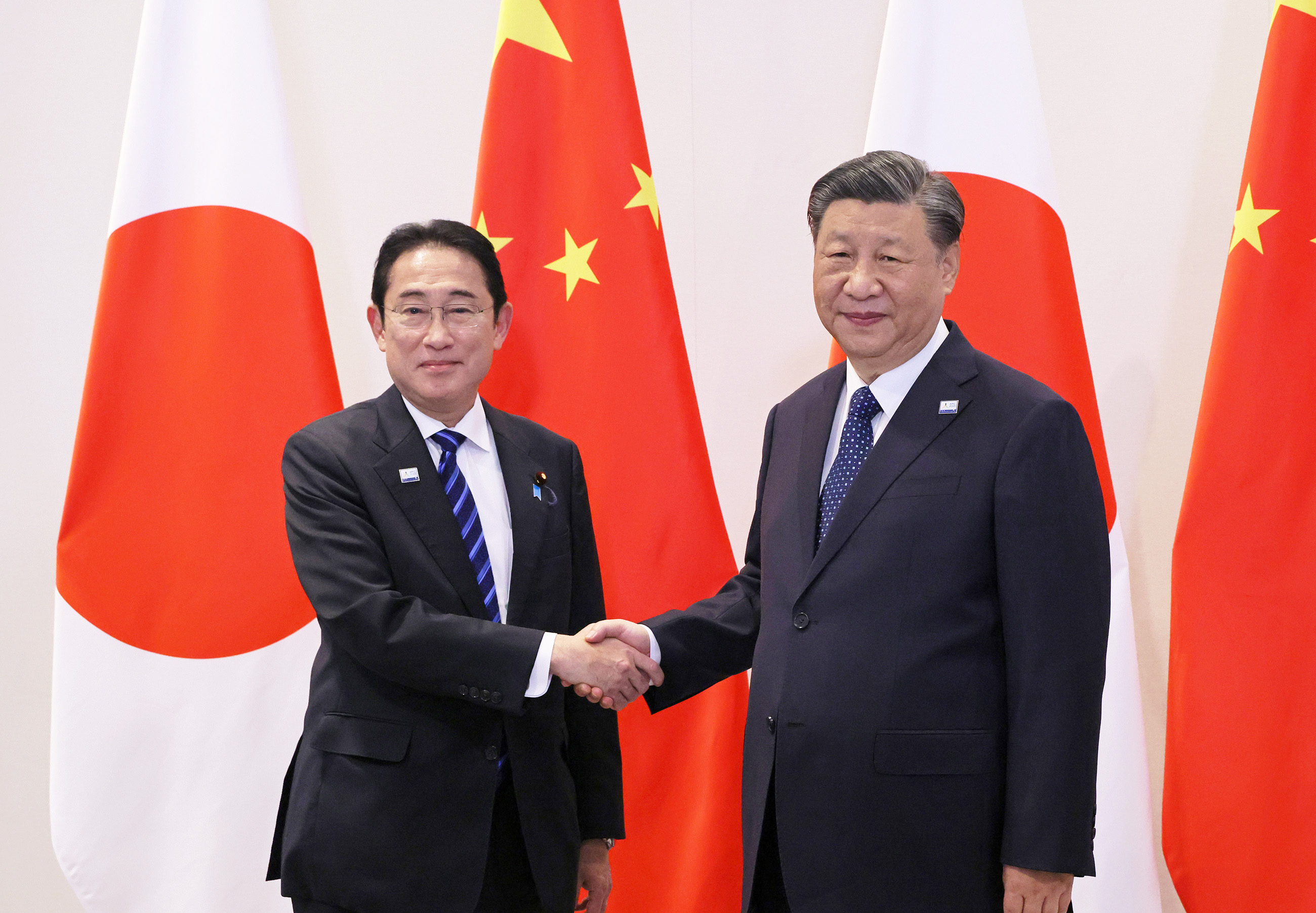
Japanese Prime Minister Fumio Kishida (left) and China's paramount leader Xi Jinping (right) meet in San Francisco, United States in November 2023.

On August 4, 2022, during U.S. Speaker Nancy Pelosi's visit to Taiwan, China conducted "precision missile strikes" in the ocean near Taiwan of which 5 missiles landed in Japan's Exclusive Economic Zone. Japanese Defense Minister Nobuo Kishi protested the missiles as "serious threats to Japan's national security and the safety of the Japanese people." China announced a ban on Japanese seafood imports following the 2023 Fukushima wastewater release, which remains a point of contention. In October 2023, Japan announced that it would expand anti-dumping duties on certain Chinese products, including exports via third countries, in an effort to counteract Chinese overproduction.

In July 2024, Japanese media reported that a Japanese destroyer sailed into China's waters, despite Chinese vessels warning it. Then on August 26, 2024, military aircraft from China briefly entered Japan's airspace, which had not happened before. According to the Ministry of Defense, the aircraft circled near the area around the Danjo Islands before entering local airspace for two minutes, then heading back to mainland China. On July 11, 2025, Japan urged China to stop unsafe aerial maneuvers after a Chinese JH-7 fighter-bomber flew within 30 meters of a Japanese YS-11EB intelligence aircraft over the East China Sea. These incidents, which occurred outside Japanese airspace, were described by Japan's Defense Ministry as repeated and dangerous, citing the risk of collision. In response, China accused Japan of closely surveilling routine Chinese military activities and demanded an end to such operations. Similar confrontations had taken place the previous month, including a near encounter over the Pacific during joint operations involving two Chinese aircraft carriers.

===== 2025–2026 diplomatic crisis =====
In November 2025, Prime Minister Sanae Takaichi stated that Chinese military actions against Taiwan, such as a naval blockade involving warships, could be seen as a "existential crisis situation" for Japan, triggering its security laws to mobilize forces under "collective self-defense." In response, China's Consul General in Osaka Xue Jian posted on social media that "the dirty head that sticks itself in must be cut off" and although the message was later deleted after protest by the Japanese government, it led to a diplomatic crisis between China and Japan. Beijing argued Takaichi's statements violated the 1972 Japan-China agreement on Taiwan while Japan's Chief Cabinet Secretary reaffirmed Japan's commitment to the agreement and hoped for a peaceful resolution. Takaichi clarified her remarks were "hypothetical." In addition to bipartisan calls in Japan for his expulsion, Xue's comment triggered criticism from the Taiwanese government and the U.S. ambassador to Japan while China condemned Takaichi's remarks. Japan and China issued mutual travel advisories and summoned the other country's ambassador. China subsequently dispatched China Coast Guard vessels and military drones to patrol through the Senkaku Islands. Additionally, the Chinese Commerce Ministry claimed that the trade cooperation between the two countries was "severely damaged" over Taiwan comments. In January 2026, China banned the export of dual-use items to Japan and the following month sanctioned 40 Japanese firms.

On April 27, 2026, at a U.N. Security Council meeting, China responded to statements from Japan and the European Union about the South China Sea, rejecting their concerns and criticizing Japan's military activities in the Taiwan Strait. China described the region as generally stable and defended its territorial claims, highlighting its focus on maintaining control over contested maritime areas while pushing back on international scrutiny.

On 31 May 2026, at the Shangri-La Dialogue, Japanese Defence Minister Shinjiro Koizumi dismissed claims that Japan is pursuing "new militarism" and noted concerns over China's rapid military expansion and limited transparency. He emphasized Japan's pacifist stance and commitment to dialogue, while Chinese officials raised issues regarding Japan's wartime history and defence posture amid tensions over Taiwan, showing the ongoing strategic competition in the Asia-Pacific.

On 22 June 2026, China said the aircraft carrier Liaoning had returned to Qingdao after a 40-day deployment in the South China Sea and Western Pacific, including the Philippine Sea. The strike group conducted flight operations, refuelling drills, and joint exercises with amphibious forces, which Beijing said were part of regular training to improve its long-range operations. Japan's Maritime Self-Defense Force monitored the group as it moved near Japanese waters.

On 29 June 2026, China placed 20 Japanese organizations on its export control list, preventing Chinese companies from supplying them with dual-use goods without government approval. Another 20 Japanese entities were added to a watchlist, requiring extra review before exports could be approved. The restrictions were introduced as relations between China and Japan remained strained over defence and security issues.

== Economic relations ==
In 2005, China became Japan's biggest trading partner. China is the largest recipient of Japanese exports. In 2025, total trade between the two countries reached US$322.2 billion; China is Japan's largest trading partner, while Japan is China's third largest trading partner. Japan's economy is heavily reliant on China, especially on imports of consumer and industrial products. As of 2024, China (including Hong Kong) accounted for 22.2% of the total exports values of Japan and 22.3% of imports of Japan.

=== Development ===
Following the outbreak of the 1973 Yom Kippur War, oil prices rose dramatically globally. Among the industrialized countries, Japan was hit hardest by the resulting oil crisis because its petroleum needs were filled completely by imports. It bought large amounts of Chinese oil. China had also obtained commodity-backed loans from Japan to build the Daqing oil field, and repaid the loans with oil.

During the late 1970s, Japan was among the economic powers of East Asia from whom China sought to learn, particularly regarding how to re-structure China's state-owned enterprises. Semi-autonomous Japanese enterprise groups like Nippon Steel and Panasonic were of special interest to Chinese policymakers and a series of official exchanges provided opportunities for Chinese policymakers to learn about Japan's experience with such enterprise groups.

Japanese ODA to China (1979–2013)

At the end of 1978, the then prime minister Ohira said the government of Japan would offer Official Development Assistance to China. ODA to China began in 1979 after the Treaty of Peace and Friendship between Japan and China signed in 1978. From 1979 to 2013, Japan has provided US$24 billion in loan aid and 7.7 billion dollars in grant aid including 6.6 billion in technical cooperation, a total of US$32 billion. Even in 2013, Japan still provided US$296 million loan and US$30 million grant.

The Japan Bank for International Cooperation provided China with resource loans for several coal and oil development projects over the period of 1979–1997. These loans totaled $140 billion. Assistance provided through Japan's 1992 Green Aid Plan helped facilitate China's development of renewable energy.

While Official Development Aid programs were phased out in 2018, economic ties continued through trade and investment. In 2025, discussions have aimed at expanding economic collaboration, including resuming negotiations on a trilateral economic framework and strengthening cooperation under the Regional Comprehensive Economic Partnership.

=== Foreign workers ===
As of October 2023, Japan's Ministry of Health, Labor and Welfare had recorded roughly 397,900 Chinese workers inside the country, which made up its second highest percentage of foreign workers by country. Many workers have ended up doing jobs considered to be Dirty, Dangerous and Demanding with restricted freedom of movement, subpar food provided, and little recourse in the event of disputes with their bosses. Chinese employees at local construction companies in Kitakyushu disclosed in 2017 that along with gruelling work hours, they were given more unskilled or low-level tasks compared to that of their Japanese colleagues and were prohibited from speaking Chinese in their presence as part of the assimilationist workplace policies.

=== Investment ===
Compared with Japanese investment in China, Chinese investment in Japan is relatively small. According to statistics from the Ministry of Commerce of China, China's direct investment flow to Japan in 2022 was US$396 million; as of the end of 2022, China's direct investment stock in Japan was US$5.075 billion. China's main investment projects are in trade, finance and insurance, wholesale and retail, logistics, food industry, and aviation.

== Cultural relations ==
Cultures of China and Japan have been profoundly influenced by each other throughout history. China is the largest source of tourists to Japan; in the first nine months of 2025, nearly 7.5 million Chinese tourists visited Japan, accounting for around one-fifth of all tourists. China is also the largest source of foreign students in Japan; there were 123,485 Chinese students in Japan in May 2024, accounting for 36.7 percent all foreign students in Japan.

Figure skater Yuzuru Hanyu and retired table tennis player Ai Fukuhara are two of the most popular sportspeople in China, with the former having received statements of support from Chinese diplomats during the 2022 Winter Olympics. In the cinematic realm, actor Ken Takakura was a cultural icon in the country. Following his death in 2014, many Chinese locals paid tribute to him, including foreign ministry spokesman Hong Lei who called him "a well-known Japanese artist to the Chinese people who made important and positive contributions to cultural exchanges between China and Japan". Japanese animator Hayao Miyazaki is also exceptionally popular in China, with his Studio Ghibli catalog films achieving massive success at the Chinese box office and influencing numerous Chinese generations who grew up with his films.

== Bilateral issues ==
The Chinese Ministry of Foreign Affairs points out some sensitive issues between China and Japan:

1. Issue of history
2. Issue of Taiwan
3. Issue of Senkaku Islands (Diaoyu Islands)
4. Issue of Japanese-American security co-operation
5. Issue of war reparations
6. Japanese chemical weapons discarded in China

As Iechika and many others point out, the fundamental concerns of the China-Japanese relations has been the issues of history and Taiwan. Therefore, this article describes the above two issues in the following.

=== Japanese war crimes ===
Right-wing politicians in Japan have often denied Japan's war crimes during the Second Sino-Japanese War. China joined other Asian countries, such as South Korea and North Korea, in criticizing Japanese history textbooks that downplay Japanese war crimes. They claimed that the rise of militarism became evident in Japanese politics. Much anti-Japanese sentiment has raised, and this has been exacerbated by burgeoning feelings of Chinese nationalism and former Prime Minister Junichiro Koizumi's visits to the Yasukuni Shrine. Chinese political discourse describes the visits by Japanese political and public figures to the shrine, particularly when those visits occur on the anniversary of Japan's World War II surrender, as "worshipping the devil". Many Japanese believe that China is using the issue of the countries' checkered history to boost the CCP's Chinese nationalist credentials, such as the Japanese history textbook controversies, and official visits to the Yasukuni Shrine, as both a diplomatic card and a tool to make Japan a scapegoat in domestic Chinese politics.

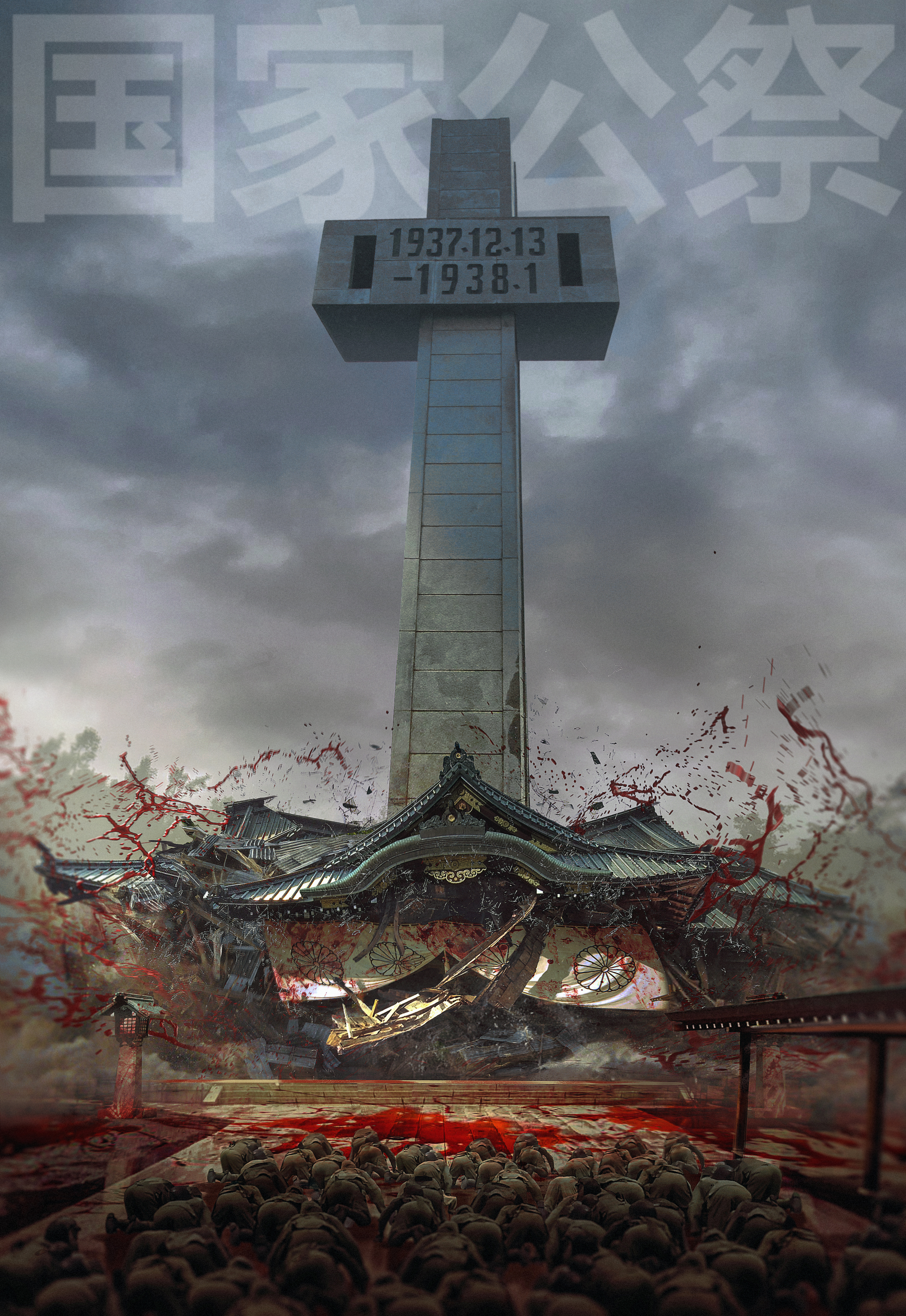
2020 cartoon by Chinese political cartoonist Wuheqilin depicting a cross with the dates of the Nanjing Massacre crushing the Yasukuni Shrine

Ex-Japanese Prime Minister Yukio Hatoyama offered personal apology for Japan's wartime crimes, especially the Nanjing Massacre, "As a Japanese citizen, I feel that it's my duty to apologise for even just one Chinese civilian killed brutally by Japanese soldiers and that such action cannot be excused by saying that it occurred during war." In a 2015 meeting, Xi stated to Abe that the "historical issue" is grave and that it was important for the Japanese government to send out "positive messages" about it.

From late 19th century to early 20th century, one of the many factors contributing to the bankruptcy of the Qing government was Japan's requirement for large amount of war reparations. China paid huge amounts of silver to Japan under various treaties, including the Sino-Japanese Friendship and Trade Treaty (1871), Treaty of Shimonoseki (1895), the Triple Intervention (1895) and the Boxer Protocol (1901). After the First Sino-Japanese War in 1894–95, the Qing government paid a total of 200,000,000 taels of silver to Japan for reparations. The Second Sino-Japanese War 1936-1945 also caused huge economic losses to China. However, Chiang Kai-shek waived reparations claims for the war when the ROC concluded the Treaty of Taipei with Japan in 1952. Similarly, when Japan normalized its relations with China in 1972, Mao Zedong waived the claim of war reparations from Japan. During the 1970s and 1980s, China rejected offers of economic compensation for the damage done by Japan during World War II. China rejected these offers, viewing the acceptance of economic compensation as substituting for official apologies. In particular, China desires an official apology from the Emperor of Japan.

=== Okinawa ===
In July 2012, Chinese Communist Party-owned tabloid Global Times suggested that Beijing would consider challenging Japan's sovereignty over the Ryukyu Islands. In May 2013, the official newspaper of the Central Committee of the Chinese Communist Party, People's Daily, published another similar article by two Chinese scholars from Chinese Academy of Social Sciences which stated that "Chinese people shall support Ryukyu's independence", soon followed by Luo Yuan's comment that "The Ryukyus belong to China, never to Japan". It sparked a protest among the Japanese politicians, like Yoshihide Suga who said that Okinawa Prefecture "is unquestionably Japan's territory, historically and internationally".

In December 2016, Japan's Public Security Intelligence Agency claimed that the Chinese government is "forming ties with the Okinawan independence movement through academic exchanges, with the intent of sparking a split within Japan". In August 2020, the Center for Strategic and International Studies (CSIS), stated that China has funded of Okinawan newspapers to promote independence. In October 2021, the French Institute for Strategic Studies (IRSEM) reported that China has supported the Okinawa independence movement in an attempt to weaken Japan.

Key leaders of the Okinawa independence movement are reported to be supported by CCP united front influence operations. Japanese media reported that an attempt to establish a Chinese police overseas service station was rebuffed. On October 3, 2024, Nikkei Asia, in collaboration with a cyber security company, confirmed that there has been an increase in Chinese-language disinformation on social media promoting Ryukyuan independence, which are being spread by some suspected influence accounts. It is believed that the goal is to divide Japanese and international public opinion. In November 2025, the Global Times published an editorial questioning Japan's sovereignty over the Ryukyu Islands.

=== Taiwan ===
The Japan–Taiwan official split is one of the fundamental principles of China–Japan relations. China emphasizes Taiwan is a part of China and China is the only legal government of China (cf. One-China policy). By the 1972 agreement, the Treaty of Taipei was argued to be invalid. Japan has recognized the People's Republic of China "as the sole legal Government of China" since 1975 but has maintained an ambiguous stance regarding the PRC's sovereignty claim over the island of Taiwan, saying that it "fully understands and respects" China's position.

When the China–Japan normalization was concerned, China had been worried about some Japanese pro-Taiwan independence politicians. At the same time, the Treaty of Mutual Cooperation and Security between the United States and Japan has been a big problem for China. In a point of China's view, the military alliance treaty implicitly directs to the Taiwan Strait. It has become a big factor for Taiwan security affairs.

In March 2026, Chinese Foreign Minister spokesman Guo Jiakun warned Japan against supporting activities promoting Taiwan independence, calling such action provocative. He emphasized that Japan would bear responsibility for any consequences and reiterated China's opposition to foreign interference on the Taiwan issue.

=== Human rights ===
In July 2019, the UN ambassadors from 22 nations, including Japan, signed a joint letter to the UNHRC condemning China's persecution of the Uyghurs as well as of other minority groups, urging the Chinese government to close the Xinjiang re-education camps. On 6 October 2020, a group of 39 countries, including Japan, the U.S., most of the EU member states, Albania, Canada, Haiti, Honduras, Australia and New Zealand, made a statement to denounce China for its treatment of ethnic minorities and for curtailing freedoms in Hong Kong.

In May 2026, Japan's Parliamentary Support Group for Tibet—chaired by Eriko Yamatani—held a briefing in Tokyo on China's control over Tibet. Speakers highlighted China's efforts to erase Tibetan identity through religious repression, boarding schools, and the ethnic unity law, while also raising concerns about damming Tibetan rivers and restricting communication among Tibetans.

=== Espionage ===
In 1976, Wang Yangran, a trader residing in Hong Kong, was arrested by the Tokyo Metropolitan Police Department on suspicion of violating the Foreign Exchange and Foreign Trade Act. Wang used Hong Kong as a base to collect information on advanced Japanese technology using connections with Chinese authorities. This incident revealed the reality that Hong Kong, then under British rule, functioned as a detour route (Hong Kong route) for goods and information to mainland China.

In 2004, a clerk at the Consulate-General of Japan in Shanghai committed suicide. The clerk had been subjected to a honey trap and blackmail by Chinese public security authorities, who coerced him to provide diplomatic classified information. The clerk took his own life leaving a suicide note, preventing the leakage of information, but the incident exposed the reality of China's forceful recruitment operations targeting diplomats.

In 2006, Yamaha Motor Company was raided for violating the Foreign Exchange and Foreign Trade Act for attempting to illegally export industrial unmanned helicopters capable of military diversion to China. The export destinations included companies deeply connected to the People's Liberation Army.

In March 2007, Yang Luchuan, a Chinese engineer at major automotive parts manufacturer Denso, stole a large amount of drawings for automotive products by downloading and taking them out without permission. Among these, about 280 types were related to state-of-the-art technology considered Denso's top secret; this Chinese engineer had returned to China multiple times during the period he was obtaining the company's data.

According to a report by Trend Micro, the "Luckycat" hacker group is engaged in cyber-espionage on targets in Japan, India and Tibet. During the 2011 Tōhoku earthquake and tsunami and nuclear meltdowns at Fukushima, the hackers inserted a Trojan virus into PDF attachments to emails being circulated containing information about radiation dosage measurements. Investigation into ownership of the command and control servers by Trend Micro and The New York Times linked the malware to Gu Kaiyuan, through QQ numbers and the alias "scuhkr". Gu was a graduate student of the Information Security Institute of Sichuan University in Chengdu and wrote his master's thesis on computer hacking. James A. Lewis of the Center for Strategic and International Studies, believes the attacks were state-sponsored. Starting in 2019, Chinese state hacking group, MirrorFace, commenced cyberattacks against Japanese governmental institutions, according to the country's National Police Agency.

Since 2010, cyberattacks against the Japanese manufacturing industry have intensified. There were a total of 42 cases since 2010, in which intellectual property such as manufacturing blueprints was stolen.

In January 2011, a French executive at Renault took out technical confidential information regarding electric vehicles developed by Nissan Motor Corporation. The French newspaper Le Figaro reported on January 7, citing multiple sources, that "the final recipient of the leaked information is China".

In 2012, Li Chunguang, a First Secretary at the Chinese Embassy in Japan, was charged with opening a bank account under a false identity. Li was alleged to be an officer of the General Staff Department of the People's Liberation Army and was suspected of collecting classified information in the agriculture, forestry, and fisheries sectors and engaging in political maneuvering. Li refused police requests to appear for questioning and returned to China using diplomatic immunity.

In 2014, a former employee of Nissan Motor Corporation illegally took out a large amount of technical data including trade secrets. He was arrested for violating the Unfair Competition Prevention Act, highlighting the seriousness of technology leakage in the automotive sector, Japan's leading industry.

From September 2016 to April 2017, a large-scale cyberattack occurred by the hacker group "Tick" related to the People's Liberation Army. The Tokyo Metropolitan Police Department referred a male system engineer, a member of the Chinese Communist Party, to prosecutors for signing a contract for the rental server used in the attack under a false name.

In 2017, an overseas police station under the Public Security Bureau of Nantong, Jiangsu Province, was established without Japan's consent. Commemorative photos taken at the time of establishment show the Nantong Municipal Party Committee Secretary and a counselor from the Chinese Embassy, suggesting it was established with official embassy recognition.

In a cyberattack on Mitsubishi Electric discovered in 2020, the involvement of Chinese hacker groups "Tick" and "BlackTech" was suspected, and defense-related information was leaked. In addition, activities by the Chinese state hacking group MirrorFace have been confirmed.

According to the Tokyo Metropolitan Police Department, the group is believed to have started cyberattacks against Japanese government agencies in 2019.

In 2020, the Ministry of Foreign Affairs' system for exchanging official telegrams containing diplomatic secrets was subjected to a Chinese cyberattack, resulting in a large-scale information leak. U.S. National Security Agency (NSA) Director Paul Nakasone and others visited Japan to meet with high-ranking Japanese government officials, and working-level officials from Japan and the U.S. discussed the response.

Regarding the persistent attacks on the Japan Aerospace Exploration Agency (JAXA) from 2023 to 2024, the National Police Agency and the National center of Incident readiness and Strategy for Cybersecurity (NISC) identified them as being committed by MirrorFace and issued an unprecedented public attribution.

In 2023, Quan Hengdao, a Chinese national and senior researcher at the National Institute of Advanced Industrial Science and Technology (AIST), was arrested for leaking fluorine compound synthesis technology to a Chinese company. Quan participated in China's "Thousand Talents Plan" and was in a state of "dual affiliation," concurrently serving as a professor at Beijing Institute of Technology.

In 2024, the Tokyo Metropolitan Police Department conducted a search of a building in Akihabara believed to be a Chinese public security overseas base.

== East China Sea ==
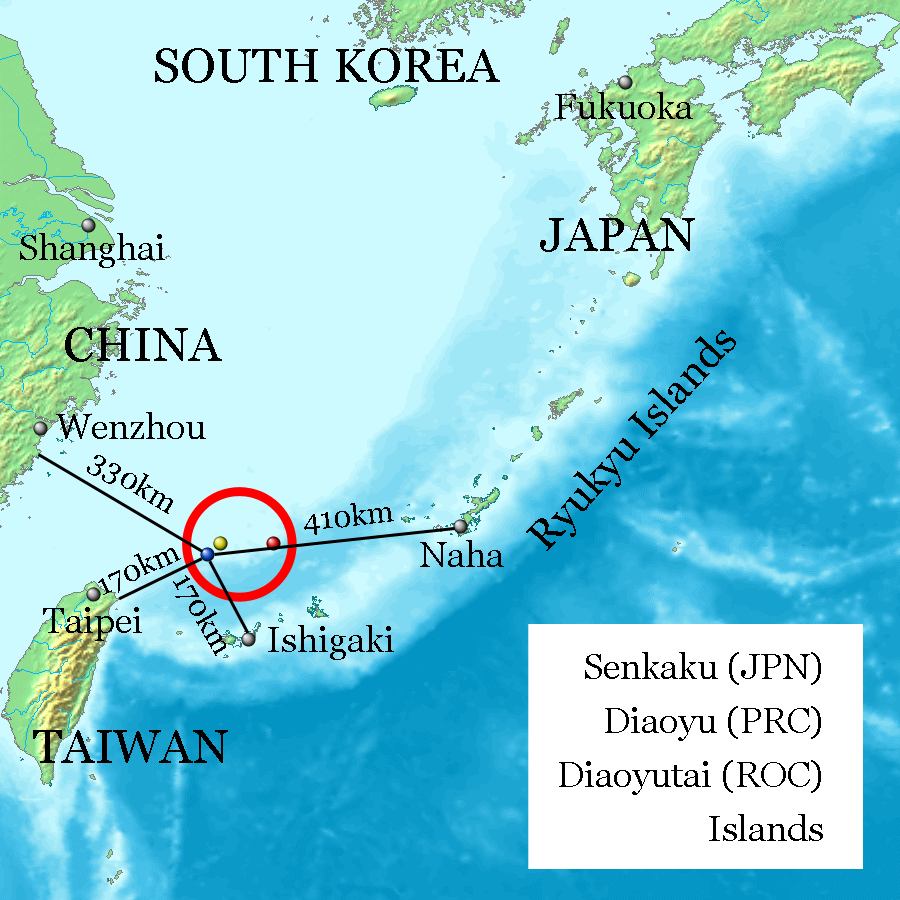
Location of Senkaku Islands

Both China and Japan claim sovereignty over East China Sea islets that Japan calls the Senkaku Islands and China calls the Diaoyu Islands.

In August 1990, tensions over the islands between Japan, China, and the ROC rose after Japanese media reported that the Japanese Maritime Safety Agency was preparing to recognize (as an official navigation mark) a lighthouse that a right-wing Japanese group built on the main island of the disputed island group. PRC Vice Foreign Minister Qi Huaiyuan met with the Japanese Ambassador, reiterated China's position of sovereignty over the islands, and stating that the two countries should shelve the dispute and look for opportunities to jointly develop resources in the area. On 30 October 1990, China and Japan stopped disputing the lighthouse issue. In 2005, clashes between Taiwanese (Chinese) protesters and the Japanese government in April 2005 led to anti-Japanese protests and sporadic violence across China, from Beijing to Shanghai, later Guangzhou, Shenzhen and Shenyang.

In 2025, the East China Sea remains a flashpoint due to territorial disputes over the Senkaku Islands, claimed by both nations. The dispute has led to frequent naval confrontations, with China's growing military presence raising concerns in Tokyo. Despite tensions, Japan and China continue diplomatic efforts to manage their differences while maintaining economic cooperation. In June 2025, Japan protested China's construction of new structures in the East China Sea.

On April 13, 2026, China conducted naval training in the western Pacific with the destroyer Baotou and frigate Huanggang near Amami Oshima, following a Japanese Taiwan Strait transit. On April 18, 2026, a Japanese Maritime Self-Defense Force destroyer sailed through the Taiwan Strait, prompting a formal protest from China. On 19 May 2026, China's Liaoning aircraft carrier began live-fire and flight exercises in the western Pacific.

On 29 June 2026, Japan's Chief Cabinet Secretary Minoru Kihara said Chinese Coast Guard ships had been entering Japan's exclusive economic zone near Yonaguni Island and claiming the waters as their own, calling the move "unacceptable". He said Japan had repeatedly protested to China through diplomatic channels. On 21 July 2026, Japan's Ministry of Defense said that a Chinese naval vessel had conducted a live-fire exercise for two days in waters claimed by Tokyo as part of its exclusive economic zone (EEZ) near Okinotorishima. The exercise involved Chinese and Russian ships, leading Japan to protest over concerns about the safety of nearby vessels.

On 17 August 2026, Japan's Coast Guard reported about the Chinese research vessel Dong Fang Hong 2 that was using a cable-like device in Japan's EEZ west of Kume Island, Okinawa. Japanese authorities asked the vessel to stop, saying it needs permission to conduct research in the area, but the activity still continued the next morning. Another Chinese vessel, Xiang Yang Hong 21, was spotted near Kuba Island in Japan's EEZ on 16 August and left the area later that day.

=== 2010 Trawler collision ===
From 2005 to the 2010 incident, bilateral relations between China and Japan had been trending positively. On 7 September 2010, after a Chinese fishing trawler collided with two Japanese Coast Guard patrol boats near the disputed islands, the captain of the trawler was arrested by Japanese sailors, resulting in tensions between the two countries. The rest of the Chinese crew was also arrested. In the immediate aftermath of the arrest, the Chinese government sought to restrain hardline Chinese public sentiment. The Chinese government ordered the China Federation for Defending the Diaoyu Islands to withdraw their open letter of protest to the Japanese government. It also stopped a boat trip to the disputed islands from departing Xiamen on 10 September and dispersed anti-Japanese protests in Beijing, Nanjing, Changsha. It instructed PLA media commentators not to talk about the incident, censored key words related to the dispute online, and shut down internet chat rooms.

On 19 September, the Japanese government extended its detention of the boat captain on the basis of domestic Japanese law. This detention differed from the Japanese Coast Guard's usual approach of expelling or deporting those that it viewed as intruders in the area. Japan also announced that the disputed islands were covered by the United States-Japan Security Alliance. The Chinese government viewed these actions as a change to the status quo treatment of the disputed islands and as an assertion of Japanese de jure sovereignty over them. In response, China detained four Japanese nationals for entering a restricted military area in China and also suspended high-level security exchanges with Japan. Shortly thereafter, China placed informal limits on Japanese tourism and the export of rare earth metals to Japan (whether the restrictions on rare earth exports were a response to the incident remains a matter of debate as of at least 2024). Japan subsequently released the captain.

=== 2014 Baosteel Emotion seizure ===
In April 2014, China seized a cargo ship, the Baosteel Emotion, over unpaid compensation for two Chinese ships leased in 1936. According to China, the ships were used by the Japanese Army and later sunk. A Chinese court ruled in 2007 that Mitsui O.S.K. Lines, owner of the Baosteel Emotion, had to pay 190 million yuan (approx. US$30.5 million) as compensation for the two ships. Mitsui appealed against the decision, but it was upheld in 2012. The Baosteel Emotion was released after three days, when Mitsui paid approximately US$28 million in compensation. Japan has stated that the seizure undermines the Japan–China Joint Communiqué. The seizure came at a point when tensions over the Senkaku Islands were running high.

== Public perceptions ==
Due to historical grievances and present geopolitical disagreements, relations between the Japanese and Chinese people are generally one of mutual hostility. According to a 2014 BBC World Service Poll, 3% of Japanese people view China's influence positively, with 73% expressing a negative view, the most negative perception of China in the world, while 5% of Chinese people view Japanese influence positively, with 90% expressing a negative view, the most negative perception of Japan in the world. A 2014 survey conducted by the Pew Research Center showed 85% of Japanese were concerned that territorial disputes between China and neighboring countries could lead to a military conflict. According to a March 2026 poll by The Yomiuri Shimbun and the Japan Institute of International Affairs, 93% of Japanese think China poses a threat to Japan's national security.

Online hate speech against the Japanese is common on Chinese social media. Chinese animosity or even hatred of Japan is reflected in the popular culture. A 2019 survey published by the Pew Research Center found that 85% of Japanese people had an unfavorable view of China, while 75% of Chinese people had an unfavorable view of Japan. According to a Genron NPO poll in 2024, 89% of Japanese people have a negative view of China, while 87.7% of Chinese people have a negative opinion of Japan. According to a 2026 feeling thermometer poll by the Carter Center and Emory University, Chinese opinion of Japan was on average 21 out of 100. A survey published in 2026 by the Pew Research Center found that 11% of Japanese people had a favorable view of China, while 88% had an unfavorable view. According to a 2026 East Asia Institute and International House of Japan poll, 0.6% of Japanese have a good impression of China, 5% have a rather good impression, 13.3% can't say either, 24.2% have a rather bad impression, while 56.9% have a bad impression.

== Diplomatic visits ==
From Japan to China
Year	Name
1972	Prime Minister Kakuei Tanaka
1979	Prime Minister Masayoshi Ohira
1982	Prime Minister Zenko Suzuki
1984	Prime Minister Yasuhiro Nakasone
1986	Prime Minister Yasuhiro Nakasone
1988	Prime Minister Noboru Takeshita
1991	Prime Minister Toshiki Kaifu
1992	The Emperor and Empress
1994	Prime Minister Morihiro Hosokawa
1995	Prime Minister Tomiichi Murayama
1997	Prime Minister Ryutaro Hashimoto
1999	Prime Minister Keizo Obuchi
2001	Prime Minister Junichiro Koizumi (APEC in Shanghai)
2006	Prime Minister Shinzo Abe
2007	Prime Minister Yasuo Fukuda
2008	Prime Minister Yasuo Fukuda (Summer Olympics in Beijing) Prime Minister Taro Aso (ASEM in Beijing)
2009	Prime Minister Yukio Hatoyama (China–Japan–South Korea trilateral summit in Beijing)
2011	Prime Minister Yoshihiko Noda
2012	Prime Minister Yoshihiko Noda (China–Japan–South Korea trilateral summit in Beijing)
2014	Prime Minister Shinzo Abe (APEC in Beijing)
2016	Prime Minister Shinzo Abe (G20 summit in Hangzhou)
2018	Prime Minister Shinzo Abe
2019	Prime Minister Shinzo Abe (China–Japan–South Korea trilateral summit in Chengdu)

From China to Japan
Year	Name
1978	Vice Premier Deng Xiaoping
1979	Vice Premier Deng Xiaoping
1980	CCP Chairman and Premier Hua Guofeng (state guest)
1982	Premier Zhao Ziyang
1983	CCP General Secretary Hu Yaobang
1989	Premier Li Peng
1992	CCP General Secretary Jiang Zemin
1995	CCP General Secretary and President Jiang Zemin (APEC in Osaka)
1997	Premier Li Peng
1998	CCP General Secretary and President Jiang Zemin (state guest)
2000	Premier Zhu Rongji
2007	Premier Wen Jiabao
2008	CCP General Secretary and President Hu Jintao (state guest); General Secretary and President Hu Jintao (G8 summit in Hokkaido); Premier Wen Jiabao (China–Japan–South Korea trilateral summit in Fukuoka)
2010	CCP General Secretary and President Hu Jintao (APEC in Yokohama)
2011	Premier Wen Jiabao (China–Japan–South Korea trilateral summit in Fukushima and Tokyo)
2018	Premier Li Keqiang (China–Japan–South Korea trilateral summit in Tokyo)
2019	CCP General Secretary and President Xi Jinping (G20 summit in Osaka)

== Resident diplomatic missions ==
of China in Japan

- Tokyo (Embassy)
- Fukuoka (Consulate-General)
- Nagasaki (Consulate-General)
- Nagoya (Consulate-General)
- Niigata (Consulate-General)
- Osaka (Consulate-General)
- Sapporo (Consulate-General)

of Japan in China

- Beijing (Embassy)
- Chongqing (Consulate-General)
- Guangzhou (Consulate-General)
- Hong Kong (Consulate-General)
- Qingdao (Consulate-General)
- Shanghai (Consulate-General)
- Shenyang (Consulate-General)
- Dalian (Consular office)

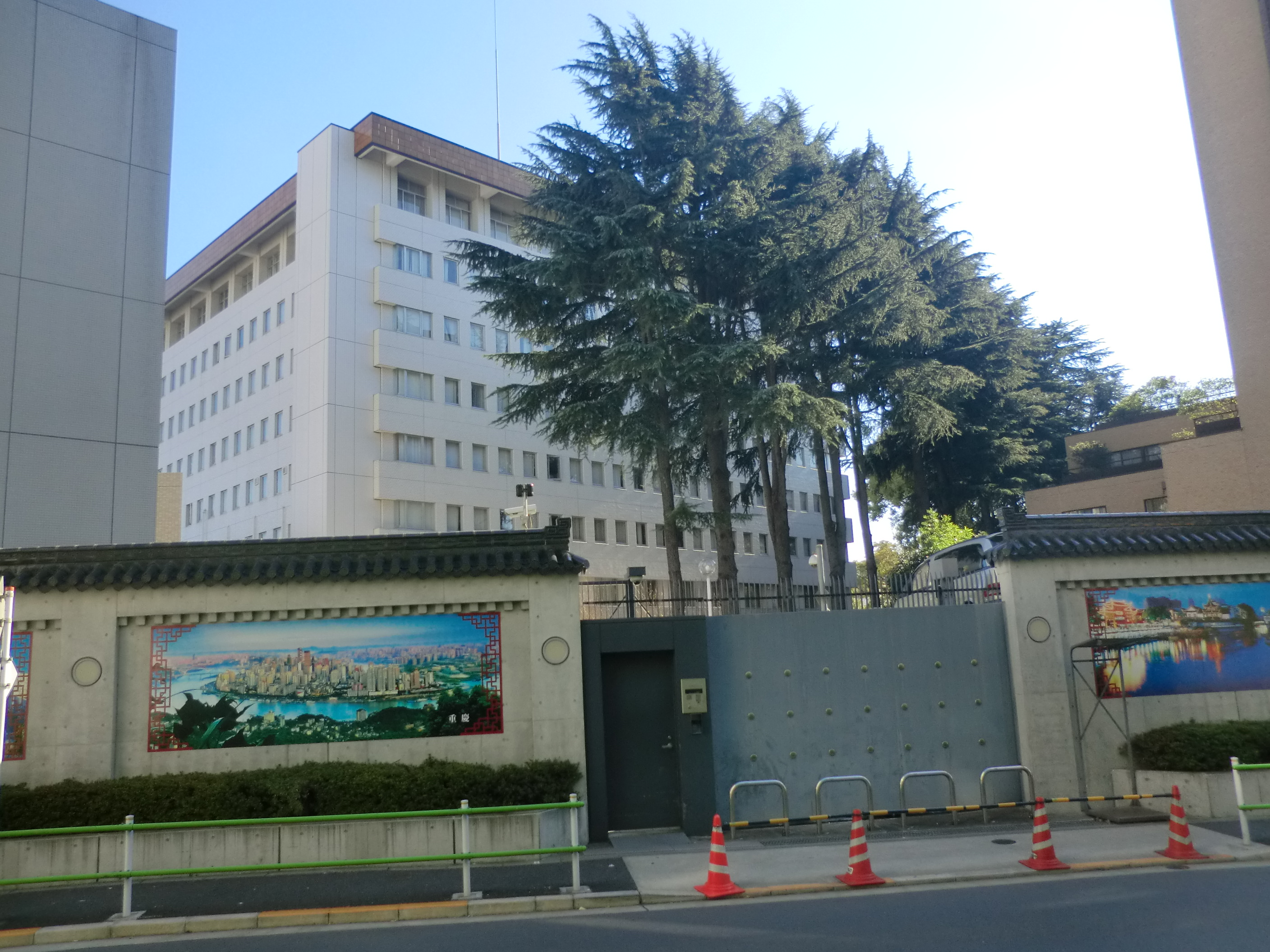
Embassy of China in Tokyo

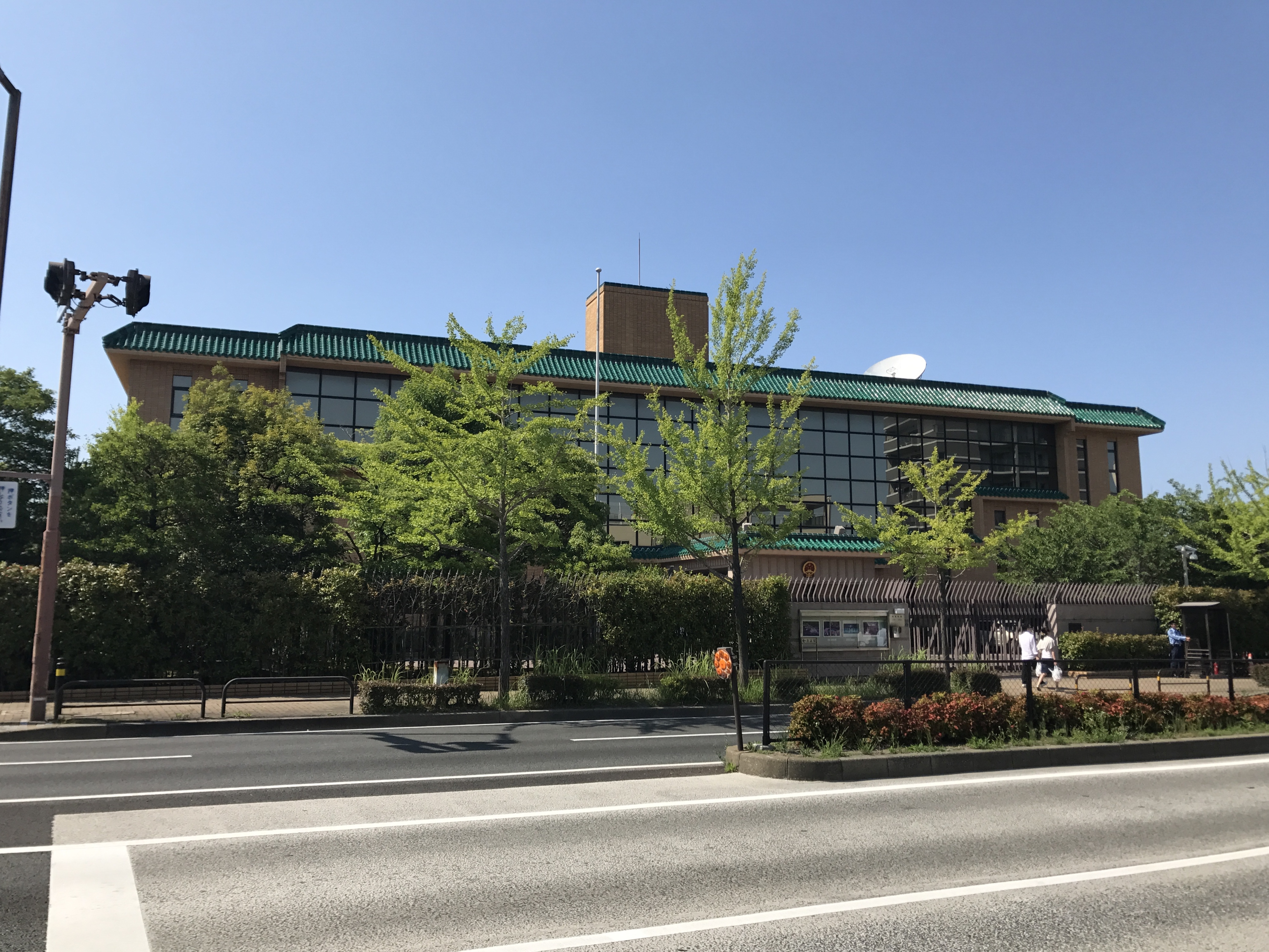
Consulate-General of China in Fukuoka

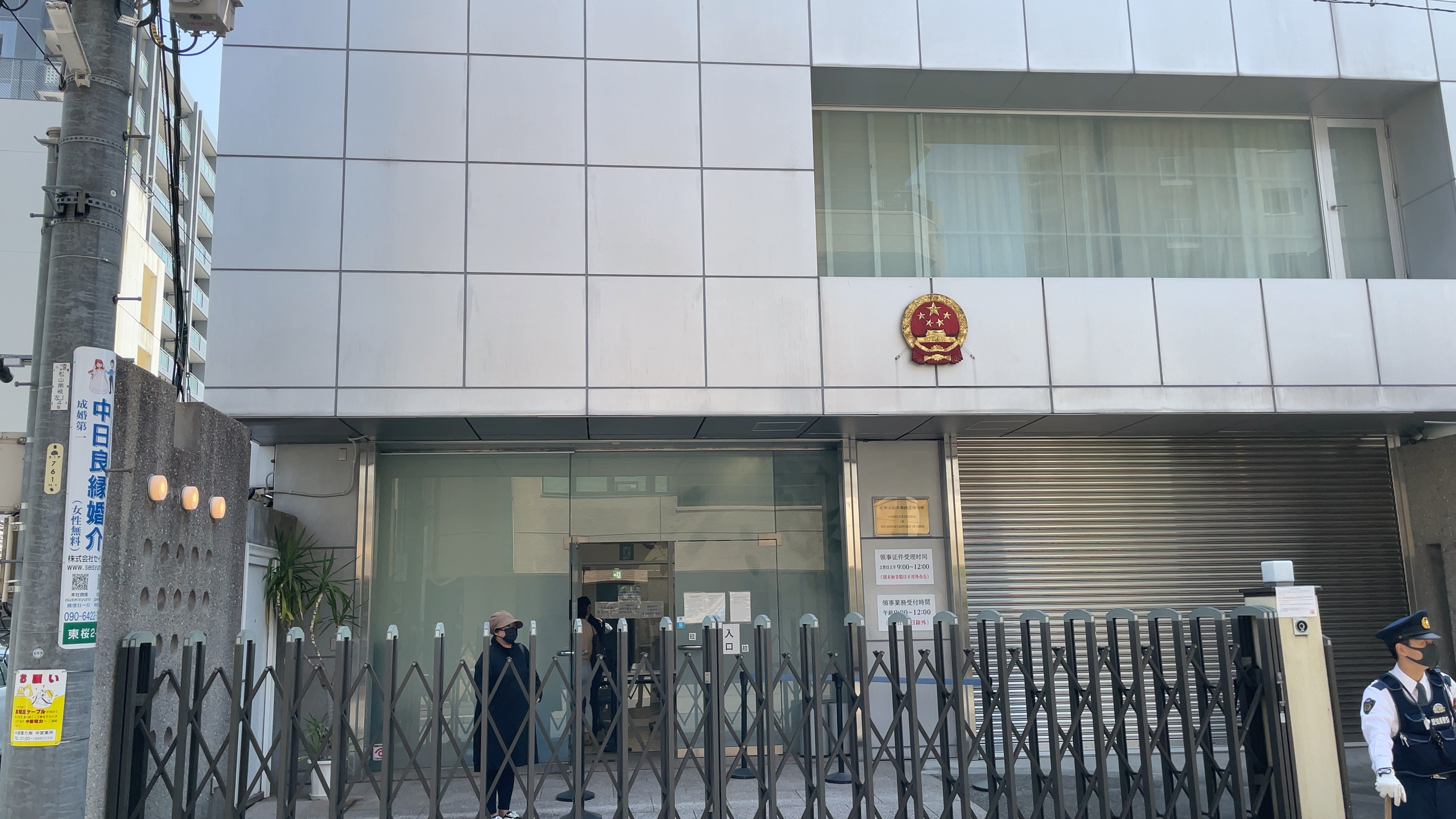
Consulate-General of China in Nagoya

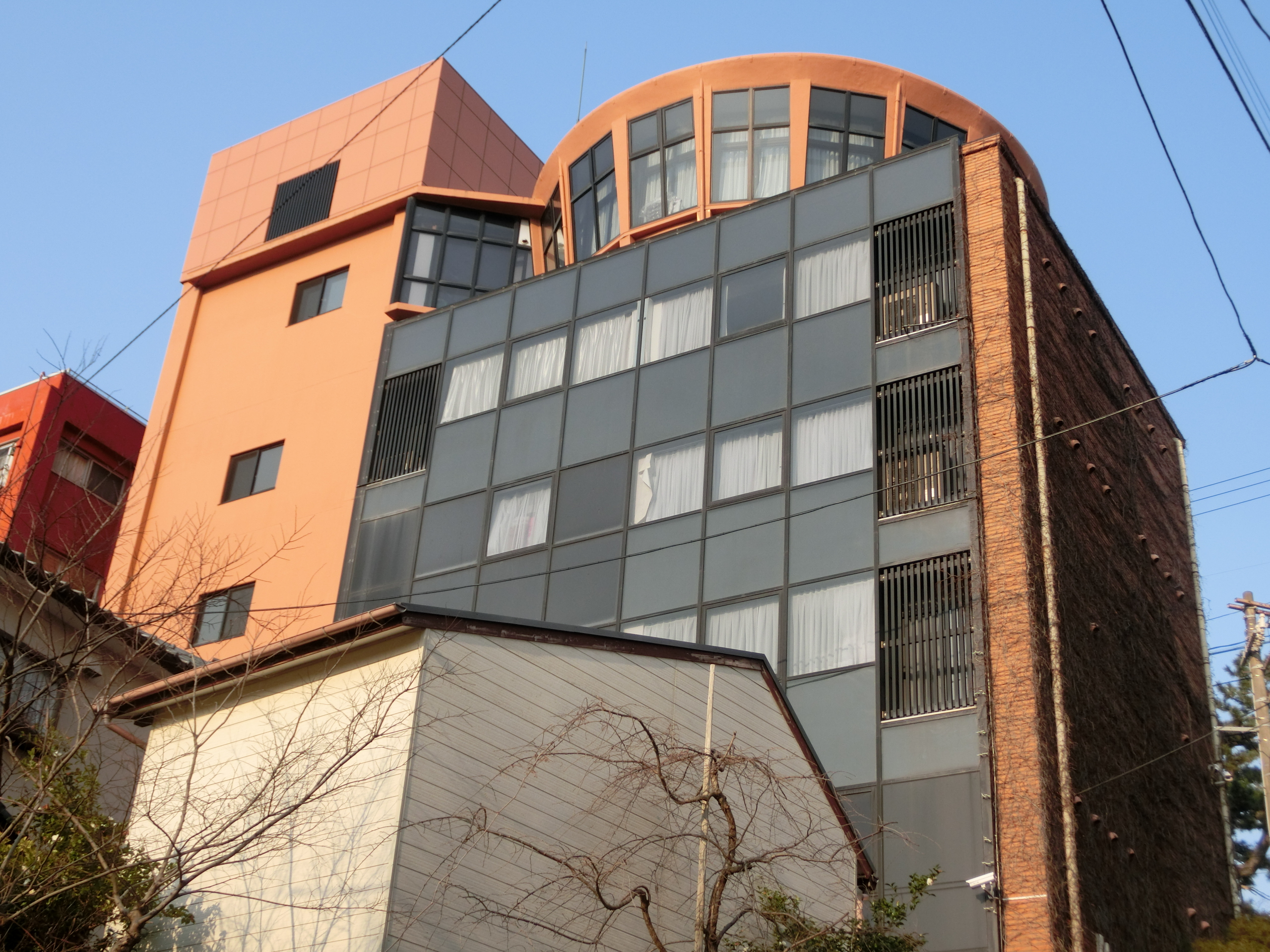
Consulate-General of China in Niigata

Consulate-General of China in Osaka
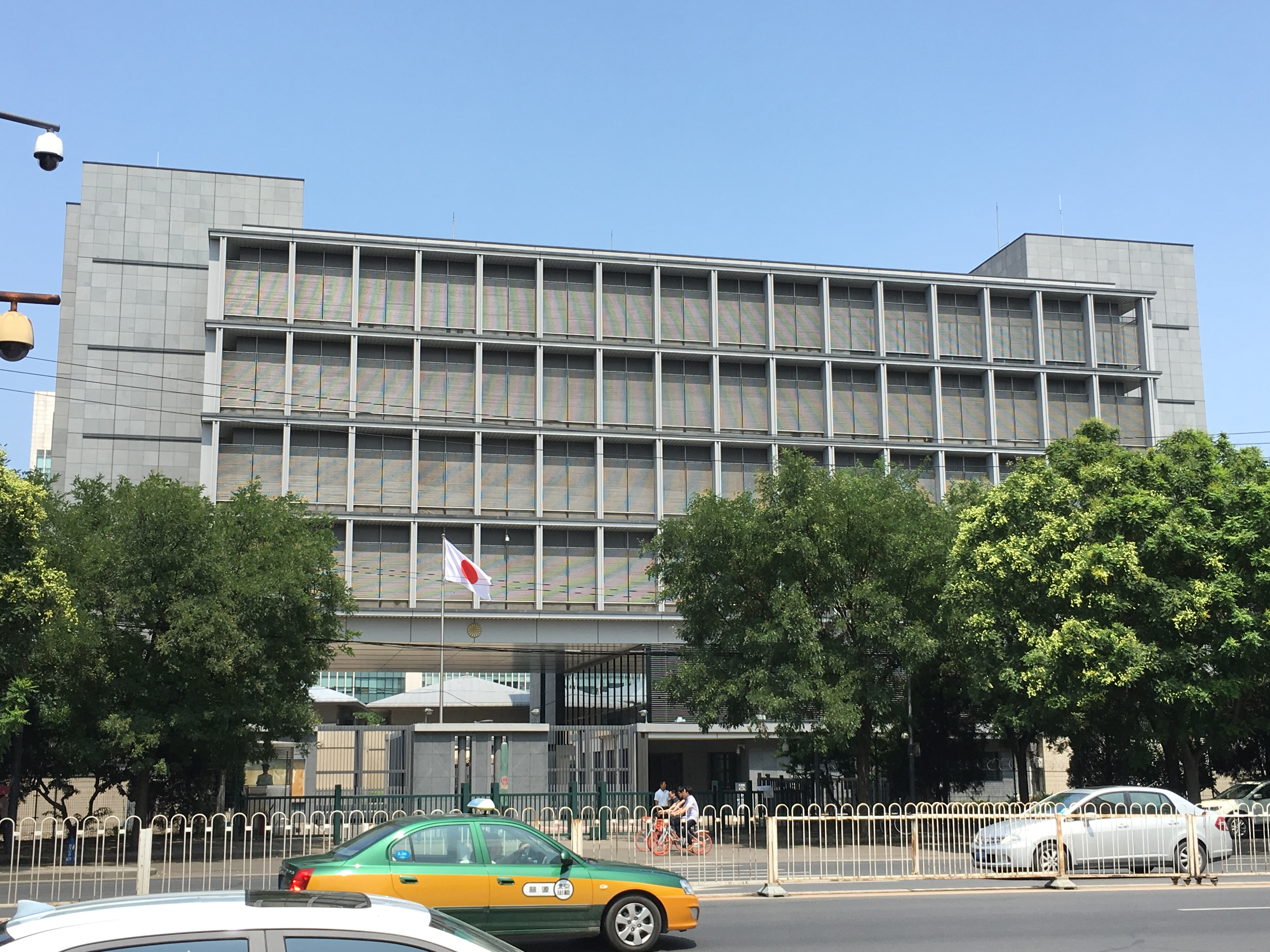
Embassy of Japan in Beijing

== See also ==
- China–Japan–South Korea relations
- Japan–Taiwan relations
- Kwantung Leased Territory
- Chinese people in Japan
- Japanese people in China
