= IRSEM =

French research institute

The Institute for Strategic Research (in French: Institut de recherche stratégique de l'École militaire), known by its French acronym IRSEM, is a research institute of the French Ministry of Armed Forces. Located in the complex of buildings of the École militaire, it has a staff of around forty people. It was managed from 2009 to 2015 by Frédéric Charillon and from 2016 to 2022 by Jean-Baptiste Jeangène Vilmer. Fully financed by the Ministry of the Armed Forces, IRSEM is an independent part of the ministry.

IRSEM was benchmarked among the top Western European policy institutes in the University of Pennsylvania's "2019 Top Think Tanks in Europe".

== History ==
Created de facto in September 2009 and de jure by a decree of October 15, 2010, IRSEM was attached to the Armed Forces Staff (EMA) for 5 years before coming under the supervision of the General-Directorate for International Relations and Strategy (Direction générale des relations internationales et de la stratégie, DGRIS) in 2015. As of September 2020, IRSEM was part of the portfolio of the Director of Defense Strategy, Foresight and Counter-Proliferation of the DGRIS.

It is the result of the merger of the Center for Defense Social Sciences Studies (C2SD), the Center for Studies and Research in Higher Military Education (CEREMS), and the Center for Defense History Studies (CEHD). It also absorbs the research activity of CHEAr.

== Objectives ==
IRSEM has four missions, namely research, both internal (for the ministry) and external (open publications); "strategic succession" (support for young researchers, through doctoral and postdoctoral funding and a monthly young researchers' seminar); contribution to higher military education (at the War School and at the Center for Advanced Military Studies), and contribution to public debates.

== Publications ==
IRSEM has its own collections in different formats (Strategic Briefs, Research Papers, Studies and the scientific journal Les Champs de Mars published by the Presses de Sciences Po). In addition, its researchers regularly publish abroad, in French and in English, books and academic articles, and articles promoting research.

== See also ==
- Doctrine militaire
- Culture stratégique
- Relations internationales
- Sécurité nationale
