= International Liaison Department =

International Liaison Department may refer to:

- International Liaison Department of the Chinese Communist Party
- International Liaison Department (Comintern)
