= Operation Dawn Blitz =

Annual US Navy and Marine exercise

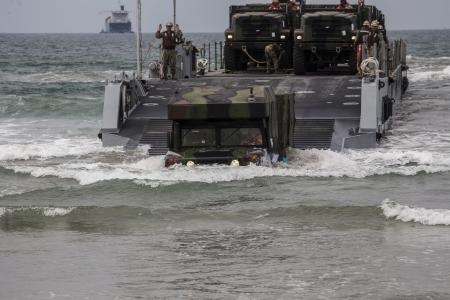
An Amphibious craft offloading Marines and equipment.

Operation Dawn Blitz is an annual military exercise orchestrated by the United States Navy and United States Marine Corps to simulate an amphibious assault by landing infantry and support on a beachhead. In recent years it has grown to incorporate the military of several US allies.

== Exercise ==
Dawn Blitz is a military exercise, as such it is meant to allow military personnel to simulate and practice situations they might encounter in the course of their duties. Because of the close relationship between the US Marines and the US Navy, the Marines are often tasked with beachhead landings, such as the Battle of Okinawa and Island Hopping.

While it may be simple and comparatively cheap to train an infantryman in basic combat drills, Operation Dawn Blitz is instead focused on the development of operational and cooperative capacity with the use of military hardware such as the LCAC, and the exercise of combined arms tactics with the goal of simulating the combat environment for all participants.

== History ==
Operation Dawn Blitz began as a Navy-Marine Corps exercise in 2010. Over time it has expanded in scope, and the national participants. In 2013, Approximately 5,000 ground and naval forces such as; Marines, sailors and troops from Japan, Canada and New Zealand participated. In 2015, an international task force composed of U.S., Japanese, and Mexican ships was assembled featuring additional participation by New Zealand infantry and observers from Australia, Colombia and Chile.

== Etymology ==
The word 'dawn' can have various meanings. In the context of this operation's name it can refer to the beginning of any new undertaking, and reference the early time of day when military personnel often begin their training. 'Blitz' is a German word for lightning, and is used as a shorthand for Blitzkrieg—an early type of combined arms and maneuver warfare from which the US Marines contemporary combat doctrine was based.

== Geopolitical Impact ==
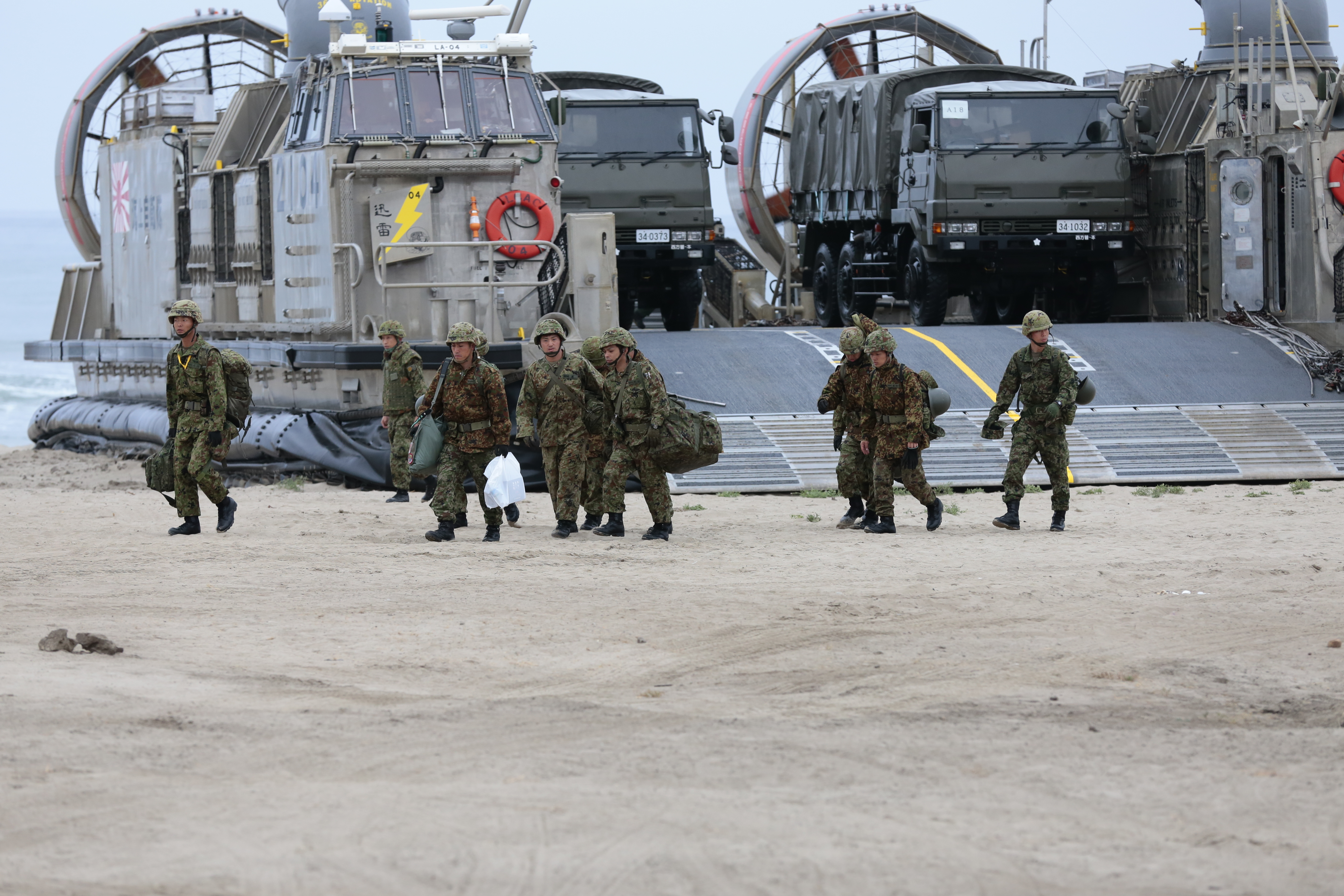
Japanese Soldiers participating in Operation Dawn Blitz.

Because of the contested nature of the Senkaku Islands between The People's Republic of China, and Japan, China issued protests and requests that the nature and scope of the 2013 drills be changed. These protests were ignored, and Japan participated in drills to recapture a remote island.
