= List of mammals of Taiwan =

This is a list of the mammal species recorded in Taiwan. There are 122 mammal species in Taiwan, of which five are endangered, eight are vulnerable and two are near threatened.

The following tags are used to highlight each species' conservation status as assessed by the International Union for Conservation of Nature:

EX	Extinct	No reasonable doubt that the last individual has died.
EW	Extinct in the wild	Known only to survive in captivity or as a naturalized populations well outside its previous range.
CR	Critically endangered	The species is in imminent risk of extinction in the wild.
EN	Endangered	The species is facing an extremely high risk of extinction in the wild.
VU	Vulnerable	The species is facing a high risk of extinction in the wild.
NT	Near threatened	The species does not meet any of the criteria that would categorise it as risking extinction but it is likely to do so in the future.
LC	Least concern	There are no current identifiable risks to the species.
DD	Data deficient	There is inadequate information to make an assessment of the risks to this species.

== Order: Primates ==
The order Primates contains humans and their closest relatives: lemurs, lorisoids, monkeys, and apes.

- Suborder: Haplorhini
  - Infraorder: Simiiformes
    - Parvorder: Catarrhini
      - Superfamily: Cercopithecoidea
        - Family: Cercopithecidae (Old World monkeys)
          - Genus: Macaca
            - Formosan rock macaque, M. cyclopis LC

== Order: Rodentia (rodents) ==
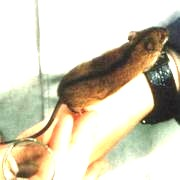
Striped field mouse

Rodents make up the largest order of mammals, with over 40% of mammalian species. They have two incisors in the upper and lower jaw which grow continually and must be kept short by gnawing. Most rodents are small though the capybara can weigh up to 45 kg (99 lb).

- Suborder: Sciurognathi
  - Family: Sciuridae (squirrels)
    - Subfamily: Sciurinae
      - Tribe: Pteromyini
        - Genus: Belomys
          - Hairy-footed flying squirrel, Belomys pearsonii NT
        - Genus: Petaurista
          - Red and white giant flying squirrel, Petaurista alborufus LC
          - Indian giant flying squirrel, Petaurista philippensis LC
    - Subfamily: Callosciurinae
      - Genus: Callosciurus
        - Pallas's squirrel, Callosciurus erythraeus LC
      - Genus: Dremomys
        - Perny's long-nosed squirrel, Dremomys pernyi LC
      - Genus: Tamiops
        - Maritime striped squirrel, Tamiops maritimus LC
  - Family: Cricetidae
    - Subfamily: Arvicolinae
      - Genus: Eothenomys
        - Père David's vole, Eothenomys melanogaster LC
      - Genus: Volemys
        - Taiwan vole, Volemys kikuchii VU
  - Family: Muridae (mice, rats, voles, gerbils, hamsters, etc.)
    - Subfamily: Murinae
      - Genus: Apodemus
        - Striped field mouse, Apodemus agrarius LC
        - Taiwan field mouse, Apodemus semotus NT
      - Genus: Bandicota
        - Greater bandicoot rat, Bandicota indica LC
      - Genus: Micromys
        - Harvest mouse, Micromys minutus NT
      - Genus: Mus
        - Ryukyu mouse, Mus caroli LC
      - Genus: Niviventer
        - Coxing's white-bellied rat, Niviventer coxingi NT
        - Oldfield white-bellied rat, Niviventer culturatus NT
      - Genus: Rattus
        - Lesser ricefield rat, Rattus losea LC
        - Tanezumi rat, Rattus tanezumi LC
        - Brown rat, Rattus norvegicus LC

== Order: Lagomorpha (lagomorphs) ==
The lagomorphs comprise two families, Leporidae (hares and rabbits), and Ochotonidae (pikas). Though they can resemble rodents, and were classified as a superfamily in that order until the early 20th century, they have since been considered a separate order. They differ from rodents in a number of physical characteristics, such as having four incisors in the upper jaw rather than two.

- Family: Leporidae (rabbits, hares)
  - Genus: Lepus
    - Chinese hare, Lepus sinensis LC

== Order: Soricomorpha (shrews, moles, and solenodons) ==
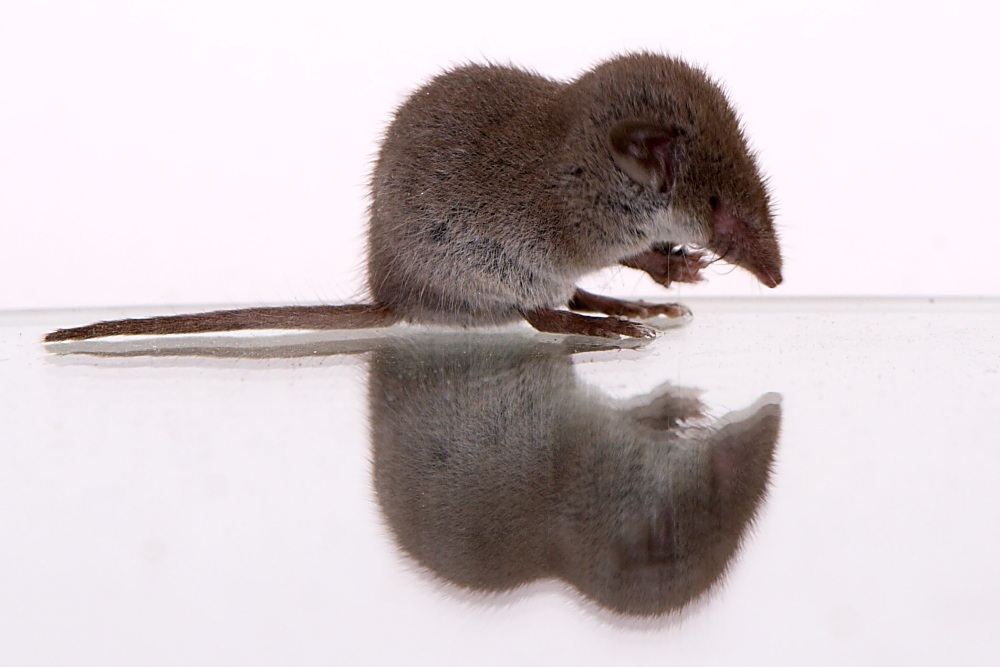
Lesser white-toothed shrew

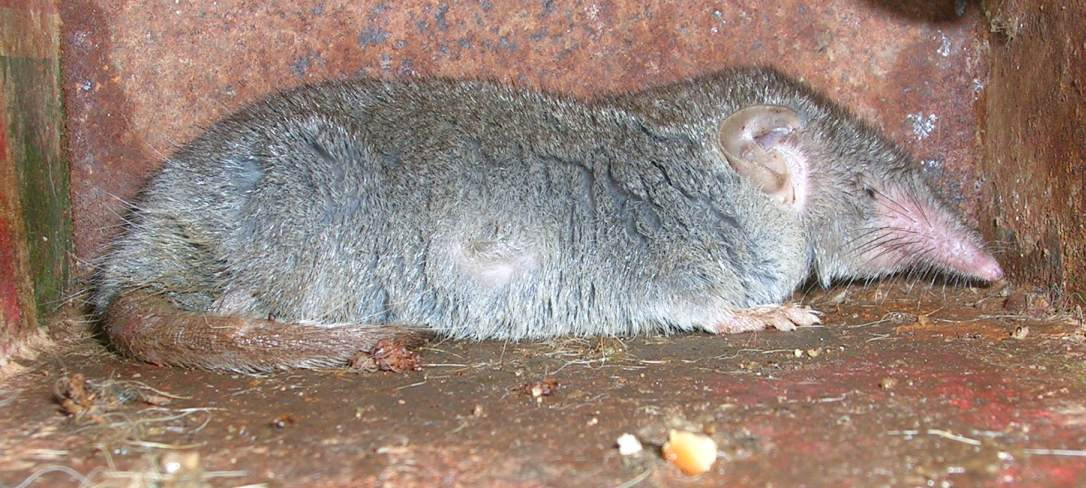
Asian house shrew

The soricomorphs are insectivorous mammals. The shrews and solenodons closely resemble mice while the moles are stout-bodied burrowers.

- Family: Soricidae (shrews)
  - Subfamily: Crocidurinae
    - Genus: Crocidura
      - Asian gray shrew, Crocidura attenuata LC
      - Taiwanese gray shrew, Crocidura tanakae LC
      - Gueldenstaedt's shrew, Crocidura gueldenstaedtii LC
      - Horsfield's shrew, Crocidura horsfieldii LC
      - Asian lesser white-toothed shrew, Crocidura shantungensis LC
    - Genus: Suncus
      - Asian house shrew, Suncus murinus LC
  - Subfamily: Soricinae
    - Tribe: Anourosoricini
      - Genus: Anourosorex
        - Taiwanese mole shrew, Anourosorex yamashinai LC
    - Tribe: Nectogalini
      - Genus: Chimarrogale
        - Himalayan water shrew, Chimarrogale himalayica LC
      - Genus: Soriculus
        - Taiwanese brown-toothed shrew, Soriculus fumidus LC
- Family: Talpidae (moles)
  - Subfamily: Talpinae
    - Tribe: Talpini
      - Genus: Mogera
        - Insular mole, Mogera insularis LC
        - Kano's mole, Mogera kanoana NE
        - Senkaku mole, Mogera uchidai VU

== Order: Chiroptera (bats) ==
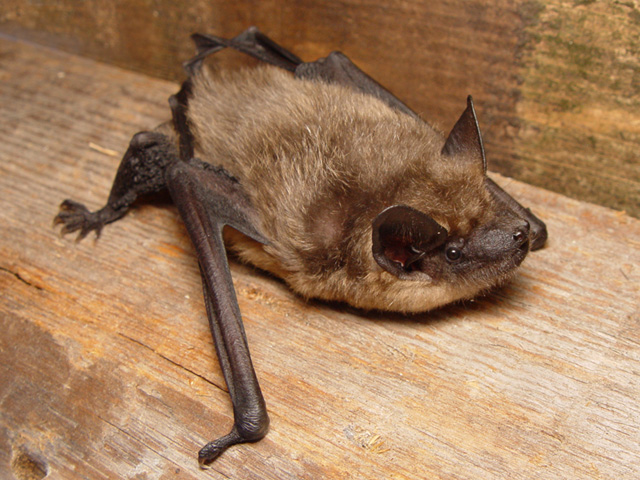
Serotine bat

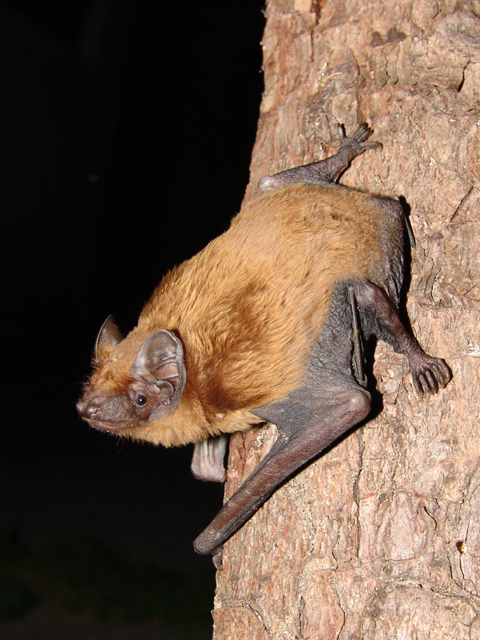
Common noctule

The bats' most distinguishing feature is that their forelimbs are developed as wings, making them the only mammals capable of flight. Bat species account for about 20% of all mammals.

- Family: Pteropodidae (flying foxes, Old World fruit bats)
  - Subfamily: Pteropodinae
    - Genus: Pteropus
      - Ryukyu flying fox, Pteropus dasymallus EN
- Family: Vespertilionidae
  - Subfamily: Myotinae
    - Genus: Myotis
      - Large-footed bat, Myotis adversus LC
      - Fringed long-footed myotis, Myotis fimbriatus LC
      - Hodgson's bat, Myotis formosus LC
      - Fraternal myotis, Myotis frater
      - Long-toed myotis, Myotis secundus LC
      - Reddish myotis, Myotis soror DD
  - Subfamily: Vespertilioninae
    - Genus: Eptesicus
      - Serotine bat, Eptesicus serotinus LC
      - Oriental serotine, Eptesicus pachyomus LC
    - Genus: Nyctalus
      - Common noctule, Nyctalus noctula LC
    - Genus: Plecotus
      - Taiwan big-eared bat, Plecotus taivanus VU
    - Genus: Scotophilus
      - Lesser Asiatic yellow bat, Scotophilus kuhlii LC
    - Genus: Thainycteris
      - Necklace pipistrelle, Thainycteris torquatus DD
    - Genus: Vespertilio
      - Asian parti-colored bat, Vespertilio superans LC
  - Subfamily: Murininae
    - Genus: Harpiocephalus
      - Hairy-winged bat, Harpiocephalus harpia LC
    - Genus: Murina
      - Bicolored tube-nosed bat, Murina bicolor LC
      - Slender tube-nosed bat, Murina gracilis LC
      - Taiwan tube-nosed bat, Murina puta VU
      - Faint-colored tube-nosed bat, Murina recondita LC
  - Subfamily: Miniopterinae
    - Genus: Miniopterus
      - Schreibers' long-fingered bat, Miniopterus schreibersii LC
- Family: Molossidae
  - Genus: Tadarida
    - European free-tailed bat, Tadarida teniotis LC
- Family: Rhinolophidae
  - Subfamily: Rhinolophinae
    - Genus: Rhinolophus
      - Formosan lesser horseshoe bat, Rhinolophus monoceros NT
  - Subfamily: Hipposiderinae
    - Genus: Coelops
      - East Asian tailless leaf-nosed bat, Coelops frithii LC
    - Genus: Hipposideros
      - Great roundleaf bat, Hipposideros armiger LC

== Order: Pholidota (pangolins) ==
The order Pholidota comprises the eight species of pangolin. Pangolins are anteaters and have the powerful claws, elongated snout and long tongue seen in the other unrelated anteater species.

- Family: Manidae
  - Genus: Manis
    - Chinese pangolin, M. pentadactyla CR

== Order: Cetacea (whales) ==
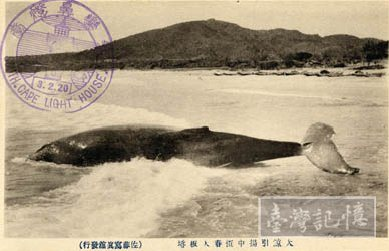
Captured humpback whale on Nan Wan nearby Cape Eluanbi in Hengchun

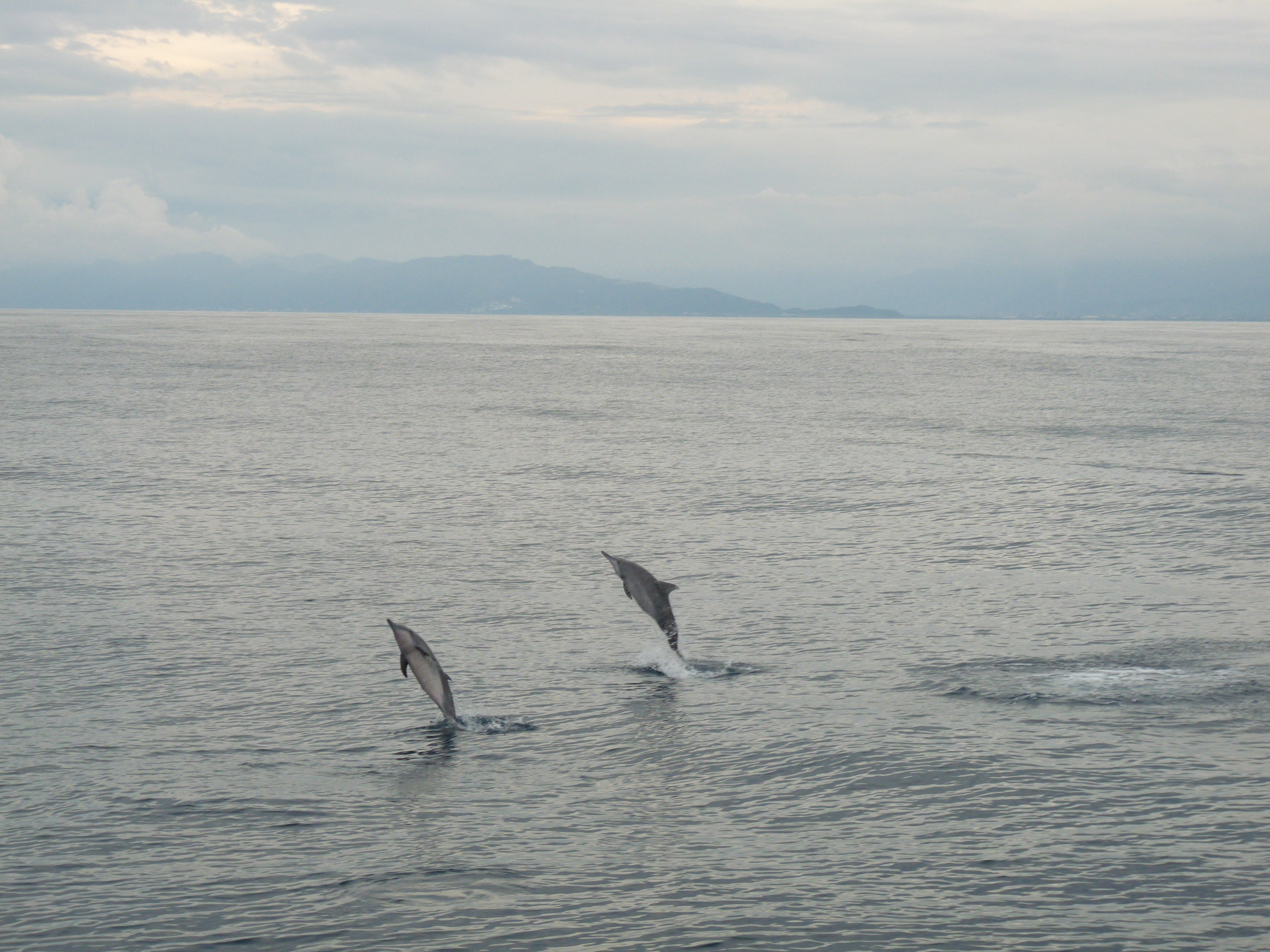
Spinner dolphins jumping off Hualien City

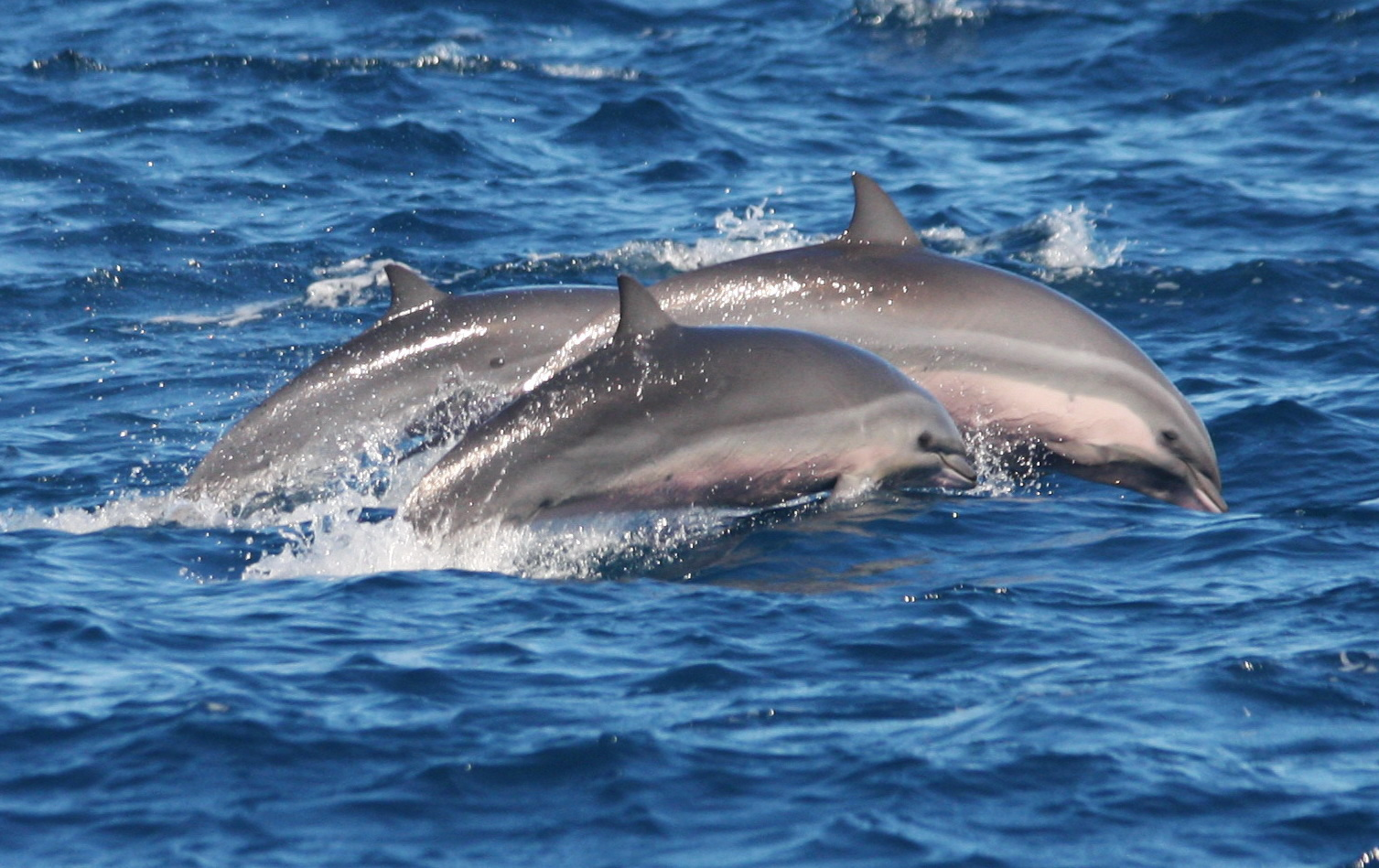
Fraser's dolphins off Hualien City, Taiwan

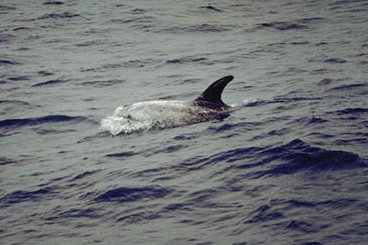
Risso's dolphin

The order Cetacea includes whales, dolphins and porpoises. They are the mammals most fully adapted to aquatic life with a spindle-shaped nearly hairless body, protected by a thick layer of blubber, and forelimbs and tail modified to provide propulsion underwater.

- Suborder: Mysticeti
  - Family: Balaenidae
    - Genus: Eubalaena
      - North Pacific right whale, Eubalaena japonica CR
  - Family: Balaenopteridae
    - Subfamily: Megapterinae
      - Genus: Megaptera
        - Northern humpback whale, Megaptera novaeangliae VU
    - Subfamily: Balaenopterinae
      - Genus: Balaenoptera
        - Common minke whale, Balaenoptera acutorostrata (Coastal Asia) EN
      - Northern sei whale, Balaenoptera borealis (Coastal Asia) CR
        - Eden's whale, Balaenoptera edeni (East China Sea) LC
        - Blue whale, Balaenoptera musculus
          - Northern blue whale, B. m. musculus (Coastal Asia) CR
        - Omura's whale, Balaenoptera omurai DD
        - Fin whale, Balaenoptera physalus
          - Northern fin whale, B. p. physalus (Coastal Asia) CR
- Suborder: Odontoceti
  - Superfamily: Platanistoidea
    - Family: Phocoenidae
      - Genus: Neophocaena (finless porpoise)
        - Indo-Pacific finless porpoise, Neophocaena phocaenoides VU
        - East Asian finless porpoise, Neophocaena sunameri EN
    - Family: Ziphidae
      - Genus: Ziphius
        - Cuvier's beaked whale, Ziphius cavirostris DD
      - Subfamily: Hyperoodontinae
        - Genus: Indopacetus
          - Tropical bottlenose whale, Indopacetus pacificus DD
        - Genus: Mesoplodon
          - Blainville's beaked whale, Mesoplodon densirostris DD
          - Ginkgo-toothed beaked whale, Mesoplodon ginkgodens DD
    - Family: Delphinidae (marine dolphins)
      - Genus: Sousa
        - Chinese white dolphin, Sousa chinensis DD
      - Genus: Tursiops
        - Indo-Pacific bottlenose dolphin, Tursiops aduncus DD
        - Common bottlenose dolphin, Tursiops truncatus DD
      - Genus: Stenella
        - Pantropical spotted dolphin, Stenella attenuata DD
        - Striped dolphin, Stenella coeruleoalba LC
        - Spinner dolphin, Stenella longirostris DD
      - Genus: Delphinus
        - Long-beaked common dolphin, Delphinus capensis DD
        - Short-beaked common dolphin, Delphinus delphis LC
      - Genus: Lagenodelphis
        - Fraser's dolphin, Lagenodelphis hosei DD
      - Genus: Lagenorhynchus
        - Pacific white-sided dolphin, Lagenorhynchus obliquidens LC
      - Genus: Grampus
        - Risso's dolphin, Grampus griseus DD
      - Genus: Feresa
        - Pygmy killer whale, Feresa attenuata DD
      - Genus: Peponocephala
        - Melon-headed whale, Peponocephala electra LC
      - Genus: Pseudorca
        - False killer whale, Pseudorca crassidens LC
      - Genus: Globicephala
        - Short-finned pilot whale, Globicephala macrorhynchus DD
      - Genus: Orcinus
        - Orca, Orcinus orca DD

== Order: Carnivora (carnivorans) ==
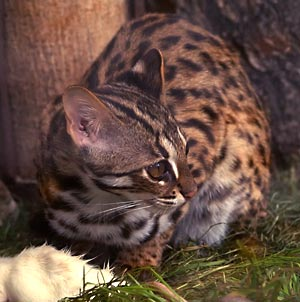
Leopard cat

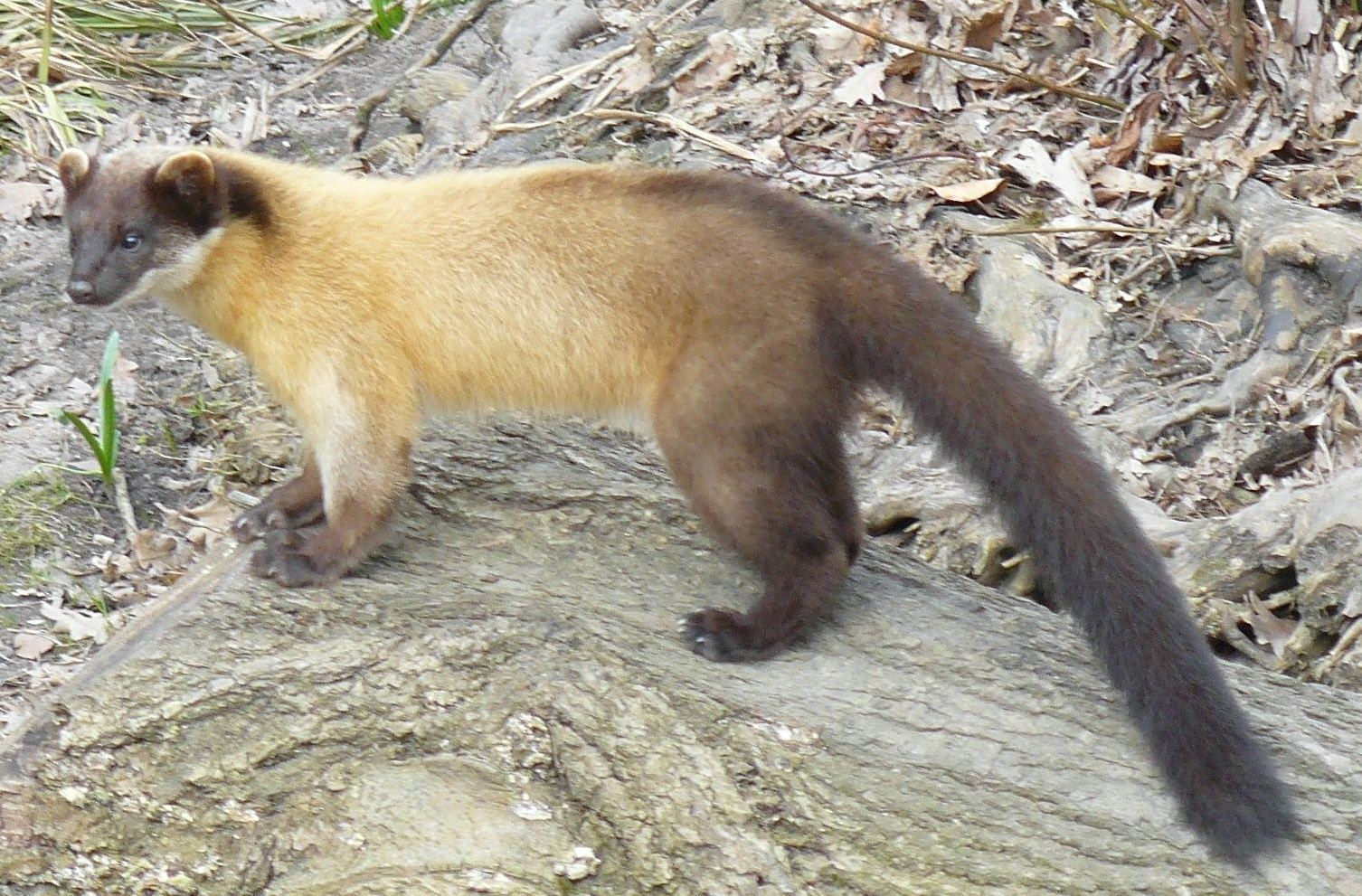
Yellow-throated marten

There are over 260 species of carnivorans, the majority of which feed primarily on meat. They have a characteristic skull shape and dentition.

- Suborder: Feliformia
  - Family: Felidae (cats)
    - Subfamily: Felinae
      - Genus: Prionailurus
        - Leopard cat, P. bengalensis LC
  - Family: Viverridae (civets, genets etc.)
    - Subfamily: Paradoxurinae
      - Genus: Paguma
        - Masked palm civet, P. larvata LC
    - Subfamily: Viverrinae
      - Genus: Viverricula
        - Small Indian civet, V. indica LC
  - Family: Herpestidae (mongooses)
    - Genus: Urva
      - Crab-eating mongoose, U. urva LC
- Suborder: Caniformia
  - Family: Ursidae (bears)
    - Genus: Ursus
      - Asiatic black bear, U. thibetanus VU
        - Formosan black bear, U. t. formosanus
  - Family: Mustelidae (mustelids)
    - Genus: Aonyx
      - Asian small-clawed otter, A. cinereus VU
    - Genus: Lutra
      - European otter, L. lutra NT
    - Genus: Martes
      - Yellow-throated marten, M. flavigula LC
    - Genus: Melogale
      - Formosan ferret-badger, M. subaurantiaca NE
    - Genus: Mustela
      - Least weasel, M. nivalis LC
      - Siberian weasel, M. sibirica LC
    - Family: Otariidae (eared seals, sea lions)
      - Genus Callorhinus
        - Northern fur seal, C. ursinus VU vagrant

== Order: Artiodactyla (even-toed ungulates) ==
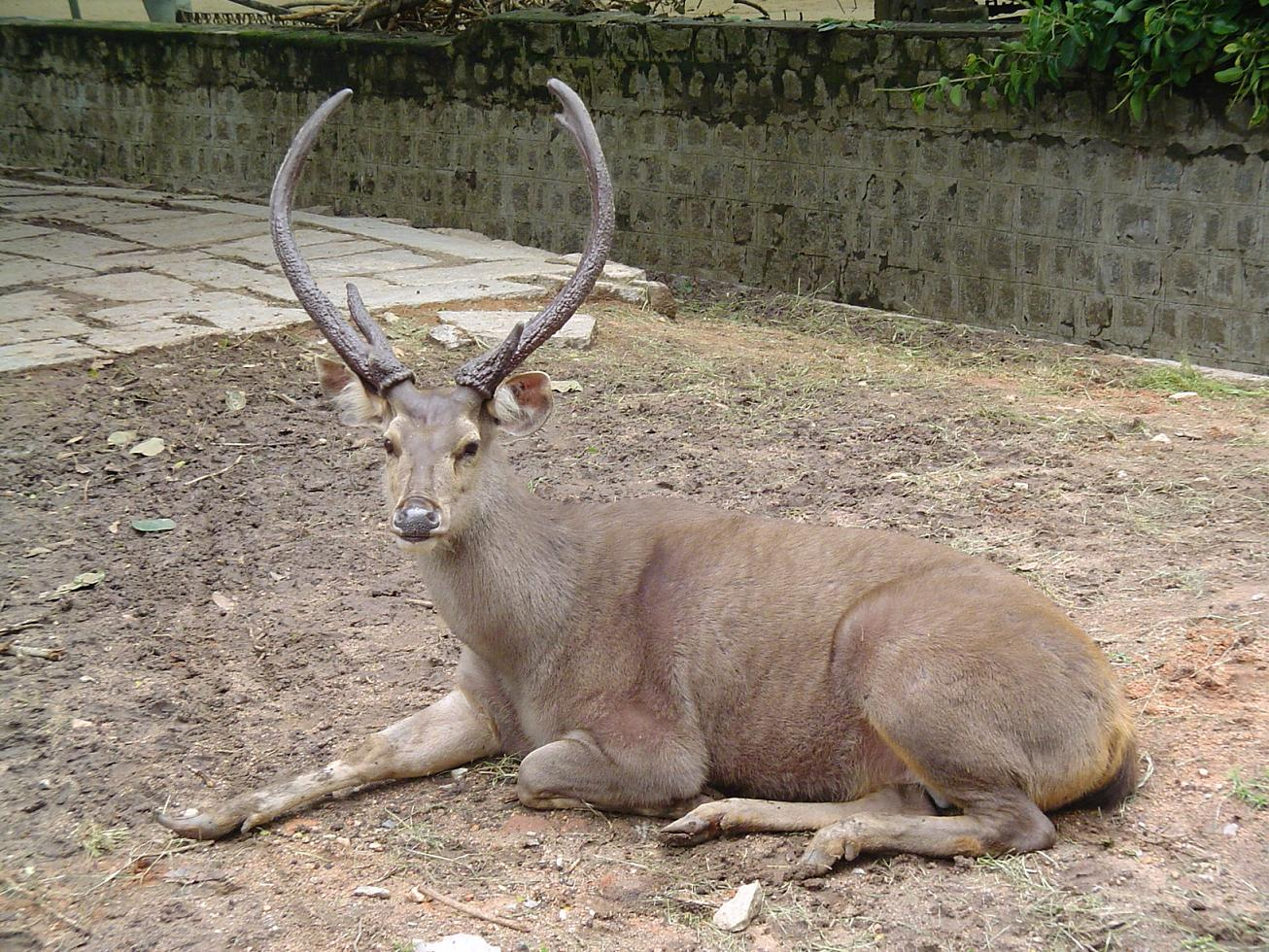
Sambar deer

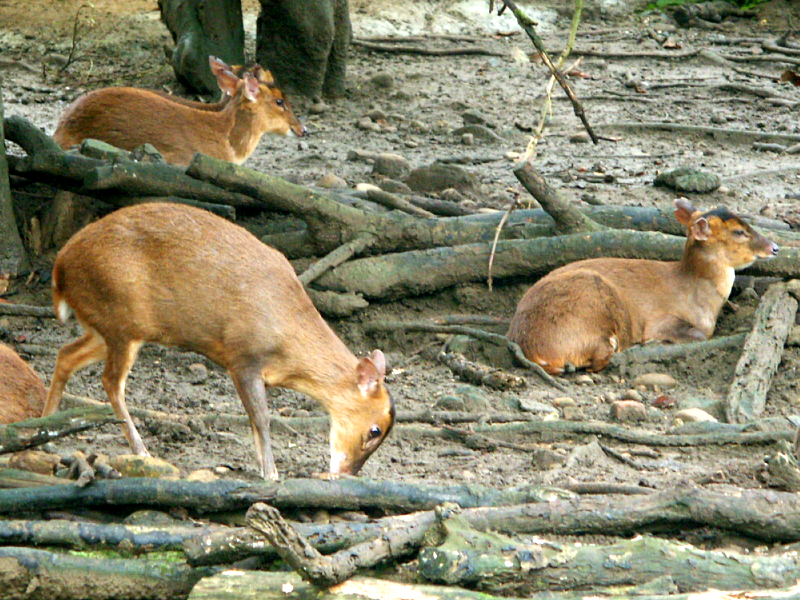
Reeves's muntjac

The even-toed ungulates are ungulates whose weight is borne about equally by the third and fourth toes, rather than mostly or entirely by the third as in perissodactyls. There are about 220 artiodactyl species, including many that are of great economic importance to humans.

- Family: Suidae (pigs)
  - Subfamily: Suinae
    - Genus: Sus
      - Wild boar, S. scrofa LC
- Family: Cervidae (deer)
  - Subfamily: Cervinae
    - Genus: Cervus
      - Sika deer, C. nippon LC
        - Formosan sika deer, C. n. taiouanus
    - Genus: Rusa
      - Sambar deer, R. unicolor VU
        - Formosan sambar deer, R. u. swinhoei
  - Subfamily: Muntiacinae
    - Genus: Muntiacus
      - Reeves's muntjac, M. reevesi LC
- Family: Bovidae (cattle, antelope, sheep, goats)
  - Subfamily: Caprinae
    - Genus: Capricornis
      - Taiwan serow, C. swinhoei LC

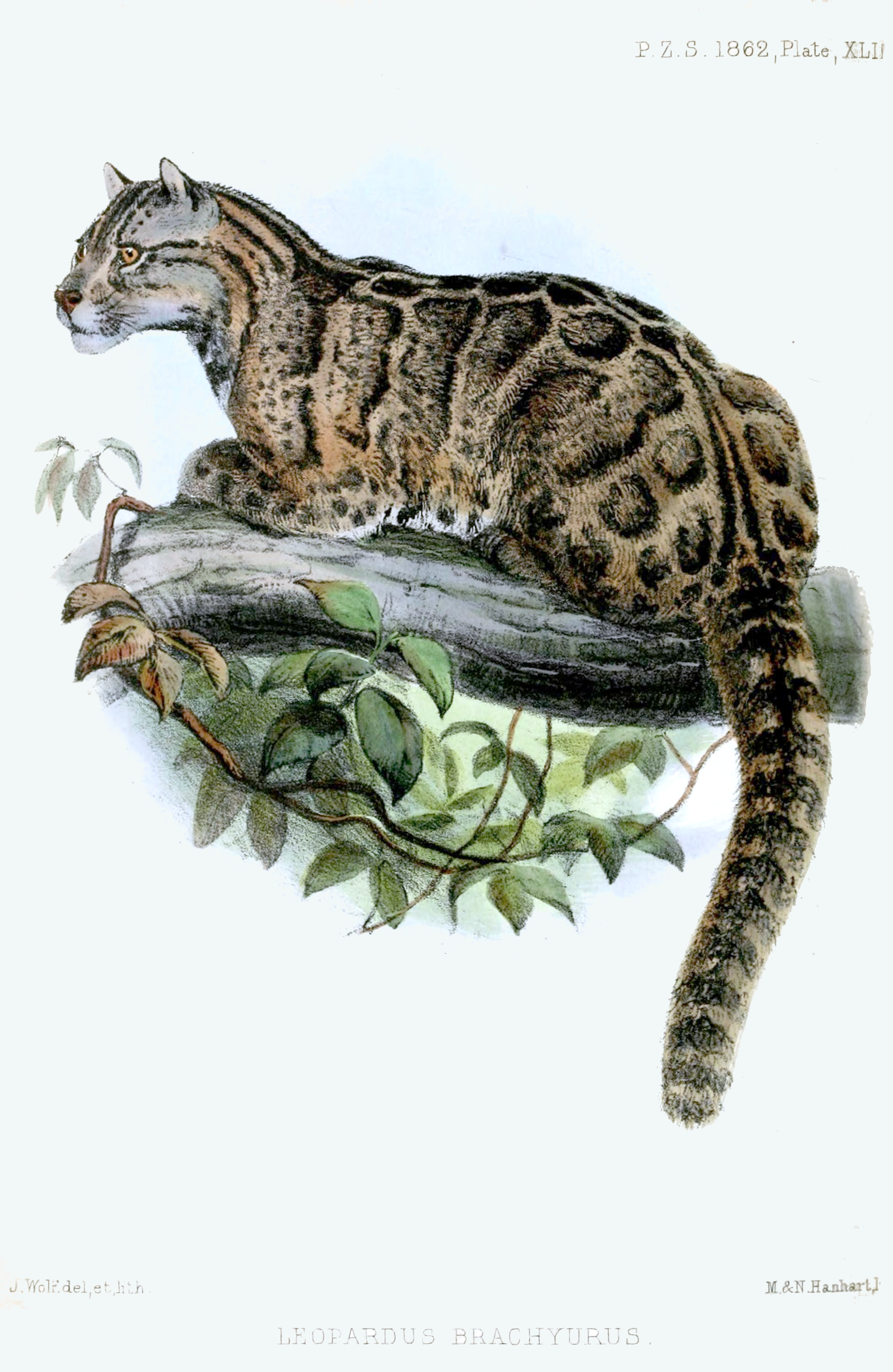
Formosan clouded leopard

== Extirpated ==
The following species are locally extinct in the country:

- Dugong, Dugong dugon
- Water deer, Hydropotes inermis
- Formosan clouded leopard, Neofelis nebulosa

== See also ==
- List of chordate orders
- Lists of mammals by region
- List of prehistoric mammals
- List of mammals described in the 2000s
