= La Touche =

Latouche, La Touche, or de la Touche is a surname or place name of French origin, related to multiple places called Touche, and common in Ireland.

== Places ==
- La Touche, Drôme, commune in Drôme, France
- Livré-la-Touche, commune in Mayenne, France
- Latouche Island, Gulf of Alaska, United States

== People with the surname ==
- Christian Latouche (born 1939/1940), French billionaire businessman
- Claude Guimond de La Touche (1723–1760), French playwright and poet
- David La Touche (1729–1817), MP for Newcastle (Parliament of Ireland constituency)
- David La Touche (1768–1816), MP for Newcastle (Parliament of Ireland constituency)
- Gaston La Touche (1854–1913), French post-impressionist painter
- Henri de Latouche (1785–1851), French writer
- Jacques-Ignace de La Touche, French painter of miniatures and portraits
- James La Touche (1844–1921), Irish civil servant
- John La Touche (disambiguation)
- Maria La Touche (1824–1906), Irish writer
- Méhée de La Touche (1762–1826), French spy
- Peter La Touche (c. 1775–1830), Irish politician
- Robert La Touche (1773–1844), MP for Harristown
- Rose La Touche (1848–1875), inspiration of John Ruskin's Sesame and Lilies
- Serge Latouche (born 1940), French economist

=== Middle or double surname ===
- Anthony La Touche Kirwan (fl. 1839–1868), Irish Anglican priest
- Arthur William La Touche Bisset (1892-1956), British naval officer
- Edmund la Touche Armstrong (1864–1946), Australian historian and librarian
- Jeremiah La Touche Cuyler (1768–1839), United States federal judge
- David la Touche Colthurst (1828–1907), Irish politician
- William La Touche Congreve (1891–1916), English soldier
- Valentine la Touche McEntee, 1st Baron McEntee (1871–1953), Irish-born UK politician
- Martin La Touche Wemyss (1927–2022), British Royal Navy officer

== Species ==
- Hylarana latouchii, frog species also known La Touche's frog
- La Touche's free-tailed bat
- La Touche's mole
- Latouchea, monotypic genus of flowering plants
- Latouchella, an extinct genus of marine invertebrate animal
- Latoucheornis or Slaty Bunting, a species of bird
- Opisthotropis latouchii, species of snake found in China

== See also ==
- Latouche-Tréville (disambiguation)
- Touche (surname)
