= John La Touche =

John La Touche is the name of:

- John La Touche (1732–1810), Irish MP
- John La Touche (1775–1820), Irish and UK Whig MP
- John David Digues La Touche (1861–1935), Irish ornithologist
- John La Touche (lyricist) (1917–1956), American musical theater librettist

== See also ==
- La Touche (disambiguation)
