= Senkaku mole =

Conservation status
- Vulnerable (IUCN 3.1)

Scientific classification
- Kingdom: Animalia
- Phylum: Chordata
- Class: Mammalia
- Order: Eulipotyphla
- Family: Talpidae
- Genus: Mogera
- Species: M. uchidai

Binomial name
- Mogera uchidai Abe, Shiraishi & Arai, 1991
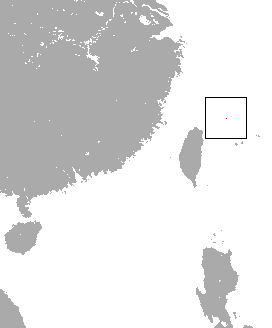
- Senkaku mole range

Species of mammal

The Senkaku mole (Mogera uchidai), also known as the Ryukyu mole, is a species of mammal in the family Talpidae. It was formerly classified as being the only species in the genus Nesoscaptor. It is endemic to the Uotsuri-jima (Japanese: 魚釣島; hiragana: うおつりじま) of the disputed territory of Senkaku Islands, also known as the Diaoyutai Islands (Chinese: 釣魚台列嶼). It is most similar to the Insular mole (Mogera insularis) of Taiwan and mainland China.

== Ecological threats ==
Its existence is threatened by habitat loss, due to the introduction of domestic goats in 1978; the goats now number more than 300 on this tiny island. Its conservation status was upgraded to CR in 2010 by the Biodiversity Center of Japan, although the IUCN still considers that current lack of population data prevents an accurate assessment. New population studies have evaluated the species as vulnerable.
