= Senkaku Islands =

Disputed islands in the East China Sea

Disputed islands
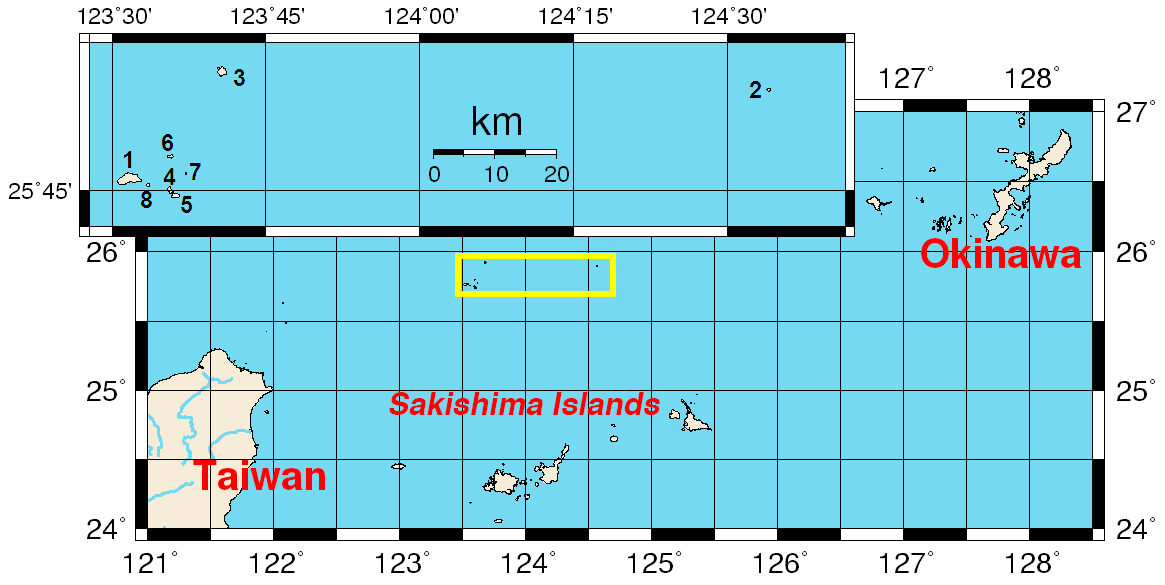
- Location of the islands (yellow rectangle and inset)

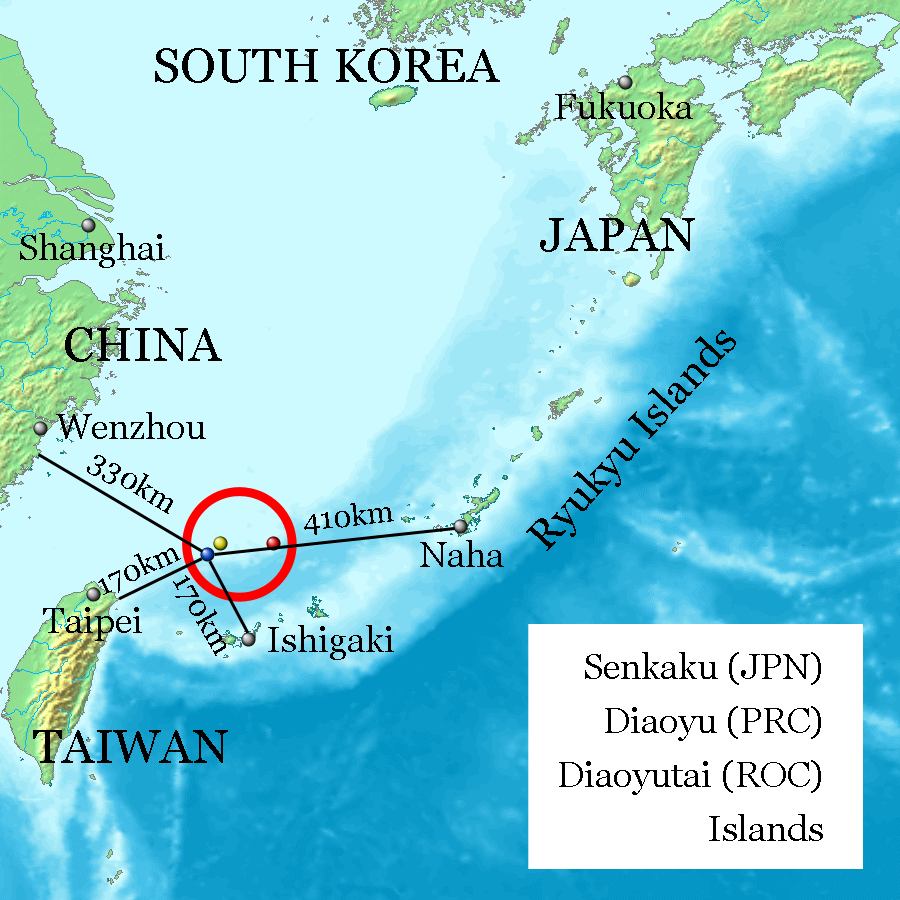
- Other name: Diaoyu Islands / Diaoyutai Islands / Pinnacle Islands

Geography
- Location: Pacific Ocean
- Coordinates: 25°44′42″N 123°29′06″E
- Total islands: 5 + 3 rocks (reefs)
- Major islands: Uotsuri-shima / Diaoyu Dao; Taishō-tō / Chiwei Yu; Kuba-shima / Huangwei Yu; Kita-Kojima / Bei Xiaodao; Minami-Kojima / Nan Xiaodao
- Area: 7 km^{2} (2.7 sq mi)
- Highest elevation: 383 m (1257 ft)

Administration
- Japan
- City: Ishigaki, Okinawa

Claimed by
- Taiwan
- Township: Toucheng Township, Yilan County, Taiwan
- China
- County: Yilan County, Taiwan

Senkaku Islands

Japanese name
- Hiragana: せんかくしょとう
- Shinjitai: 尖閣諸島
Transcriptions
- Revised Hepburn: Senkaku-shotō
- Kunrei-shiki: Senkaku-syotô

Chinese name
- Traditional Chinese: 釣魚島及其附屬島嶼
- Simplified Chinese: 钓鱼岛及其附属岛屿
- Literal meaning: Diaoyu Island and its affiliated islands
Transcriptions
Standard Mandarin
- Hanyu Pinyin: Diàoyúdǎo jí qí fùshǔ dǎoyǔ
- Bopomofo: ㄉㄧㄠˋ ㄩˊ ㄉㄠˇ ㄐㄧˊ ㄑㄧˊ ㄈㄨˋ ㄕㄨˇ ㄉㄠˇ ㄩˇ
- Wade–Giles: Tiao^{4}-yü^{2}-tao^{3} chi^{2} ch'i^{2} fu^{4}-shu^{3} tao^{3}-yü^{3}
- IPA: [tjâʊy̌tàʊ tɕǐ tɕʰǐ fûʂù tàʊỳ]

Taiwanese name
- Traditional Chinese: 釣魚臺列嶼
- Simplified Chinese: 钓鱼台列屿
- Literal meaning: Diaoyutai / Tiaoyutai Islands
Transcriptions
Standard Mandarin
- Hanyu Pinyin: Diàoyútái liè yǔ
- Bopomofo: ㄉㄧㄠˋ ㄩˊ ㄊㄞˊ ㄌㄧㄝˋ ㄩˇ
- Wade–Giles: Tiao^{4}-yü^{2}-t'ai^{2} lieh^{4} yü^{3}
- IPA: [tjâʊy̌tʰǎɪ ljê ỳ]

The Senkaku Islands, (Note: Japanese: 尖閣諸島, Senkaku-shotō; variants: 尖閣群島, Senkaku-guntō; and 尖閣列島, Senkaku-rettō) known as the Diaoyu Islands (Note: Chinese: 钓鱼岛) in China and the Diaoyutai Islands (Note: Chinese: 釣魚臺列嶼) in Taiwan, are a group of uninhabited islands in the East China Sea, administered by Japan. They were historically known in the Western world as the Pinnacle Islands. The islands are located northeast of Taiwan, east of China, west of Okinawa Island, and north of the southwestern end of the Ryukyu Islands.

The islands are the focus of a territorial dispute between Japan, China, and Taiwan. China claims the discovery and ownership of the islands from the 14th century, while Japan maintained ownership of the islands from 1895 until its surrender at the end of World War II. The United States received administrative rights of the islands from Japan under the Treaty of San Francisco and administered the islands as part of the United States Civil Administration of the Ryukyu Islands from 1945 until 1972, before returning them to Japanese control under the 1971 Okinawa Reversion Agreement. A major catalyst for further interest in the disputed islands was the discovery of potential offshore oil and natural gas reserves beneath the seabed of the East China Sea, which was confirmed in official reports of several international organizations in 1968 and 1969. Despite the diplomatic stalemate between China and Taiwan, both governments agree that the islands are part of Taiwan as part of Toucheng Township in Yilan County. Japan administers the Senkaku Islands as part of the city of Ishigaki in Okinawa Prefecture. It does not acknowledge the claims of China nor Taiwan, but it has not allowed the Ishigaki administration to develop the islands.

As a result of the dispute, public access to the uninhabited islands is restricted; Japan’s central government has denied landing requests even from local authorities. Although the islands are administered by Japan since 1895, a continuity interrupted only by US administration from 1945 to 1972, this long-standing status quo has been increasingly challenged by China since 2010s; Since the early 2010s, China Coast Guard have frequently entered the surrounding waters of the islands, prompting responses and exchanges of warnings with the Japan Coast Guard. China has also announced territorial-sea baselines (2012) and established an East China Sea ADIZ (2013), all of which are contested by Japan. The United States, which returned administrative rights of the islands to Japan in 1972, takes no position on the ultimate sovereignty, but acknowledges that the islands are under Japanese administration and are covered by the US–Japan security treaty. Recent US–Japan statements also refer to Japan’s longstanding administration and oppose any unilateral actions that seek to undermine it.

The Senkaku Islands are important nesting sites for seabirds, and are one of two remaining nesting sites in the world for the short-tailed albatross, alongside Tori-shima, Izu Islands.

== Names ==
The islands are referred to as the Senkaku Islands (尖閣諸島, Senkaku-shotō; variants: 尖閣群島 Senkaku-guntō and 尖閣列島 Senkaku-rettō) in Japanese. In mainland China, they are known as the Diaoyu Islands (Chinese: 钓鱼岛; pinyin: Diàoyúdǎo) or more fully "Diaoyu Dao and its affiliated islands" (Chinese: 钓鱼岛及其附属岛屿; pinyin: Diàoyúdǎo jí qí fùshǔ dǎoyǔ), while in Taiwan they are called the Diaoyutai Islands, or previously spelled as Tiaoyutai Islands (Chinese: 釣魚臺列嶼; pinyin: Diàoyútái liè yǔ). In Western sources, the historical English name Pinnacle Islands is occasionally still used when neutrality among the competing national claims is desirable.

In Okinawan (northern Ryukyu), the islands are known as ʔiyukubajima (魚蒲葵島), while their Yaeyama (southern Ryukyu) name is iigunkubajima.

Chinese records of these islands date back to as early as the 15th century, when they were referred to as Diaoyu in books such as Voyage with a Tail Wind (Chinese: 順風相送; pinyin: Shùnfēng Xiāngsòng) (1403) and Record of the Imperial Envoy's Visit to Ryūkyū (Chinese: 使琉球錄; pinyin: Shǐ Liúqiú Lù) (1534). Adopted by the Chinese Imperial Map of the Ming Dynasty, the Chinese name for the island group (Diaoyu) and the Japanese name for the main island (Uotsuri) both mean "fishing" or "angling".

== History ==
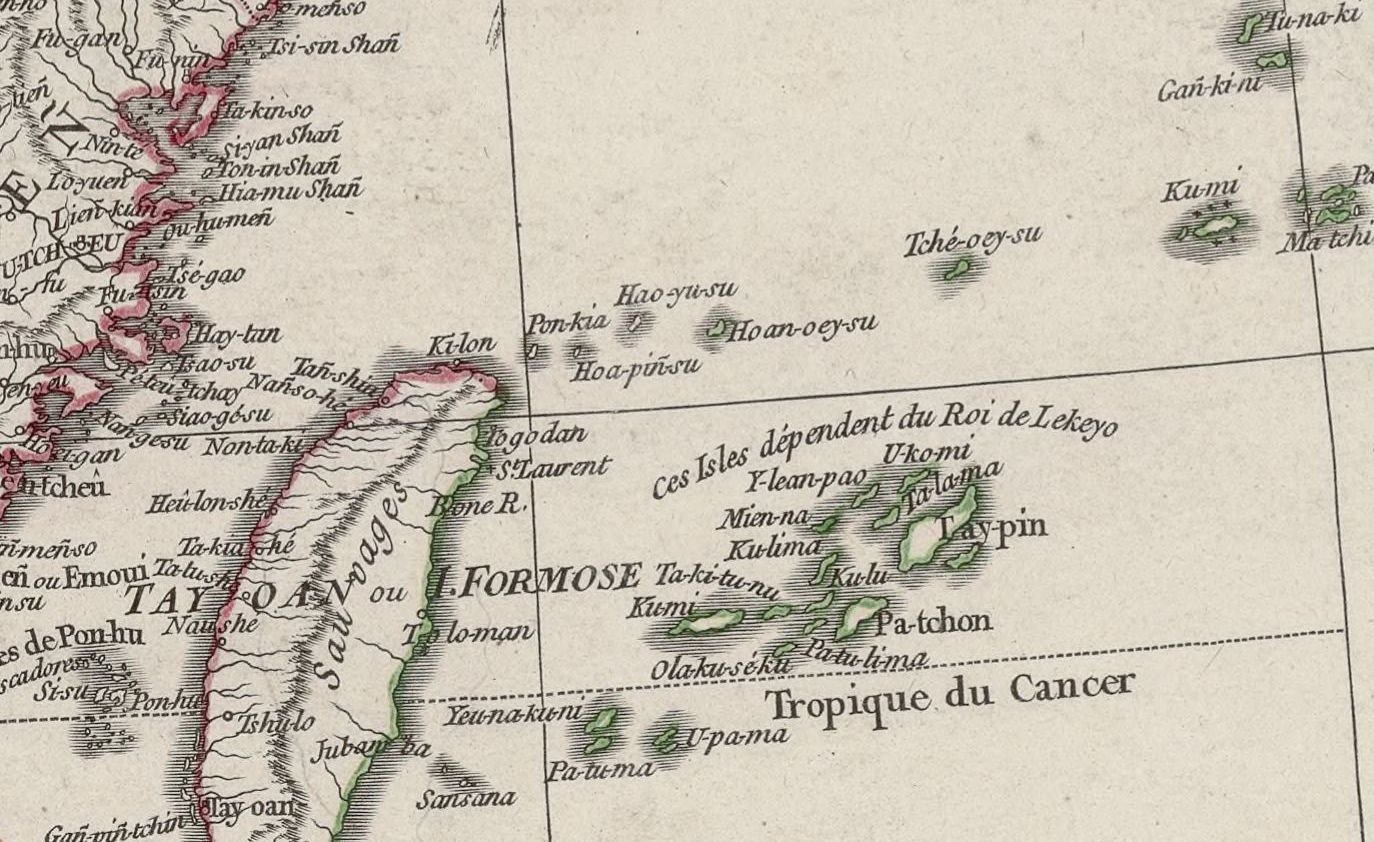
An extract from a map of Asia (China and Tartary) drawn by Jean-Baptiste Bourguignon d'Anville in 1752.

=== Early history ===
Historically, the Chinese had used the uninhabited islands as navigational markers in making the voyage to the Ryukyu Kingdom upon commencement of diplomatic missions to the kingdom, "resetting the compass at a particular isle in order to reach the next one."

The first published description of the islands in Europe appears in a book imported by Isaac Titsingh in 1796. His small library of Japanese books included Sangoku Tsūran Zusetsu (三國通覧圖說, An Illustrated Description of Three Countries) by Hayashi Shihei. This text, which was published in Japan in 1785, described the Ryukyu Kingdom. Hayashi followed convention in giving the islands their Chinese names in his map in the text, where he coloured them in the same pink as mainland China.

In 1832, the Oriental Translation Fund of Great Britain and Ireland supported the posthumous abridged publication of Titsingh's French translation.

The name, "Pinnacle Isles" was first used by James Colnett, who charted them during his 1789–1791 voyage in the Argonaut. William Robert Broughton sailed past them in November 1797 during his voyage of discovery to the North Pacific in HMS Providence, and referred to Diaoyu Island/Uotsuri Island as "Peaks Island". Reference was made to the islands in Edward Belcher's 1848 account of the voyages of HMS Sammarang. Captain Belcher remarked that "the names assigned in this region have been too hastily admitted." Belcher reported anchoring off Pinnacle Island in March 1845.

In the 1870s and 1880s, the English name Pinnacle Islands was used by the British navy for the rocks adjacent to the largest island, Uotsuri-shima / Diaoyu Dao (then called 和平嶼; hô-pîng-sū; 'Peace Island in Hokkien'); Kuba-shima / Huangwei Yu (then called Ti-a-usu); and Taishō-tō / Chiwei Yu.

A Japanese navy record issued in 1886 first started to identify the islets using equivalents of the Chinese and English terms employed by the British. The name "Senkaku Retto" is not found in any Japanese historical document before 1900 (the term "Senkaku Gunto" began to be used in the late 19th century), and first appeared in print in a geography journal published in 1900. It was derived from a translation of the English name Pinnacle Islands into a Sinicized Japanese term "Sento Shoto" (as opposed to "Senkaku Retto", i.e., the term used by the Japanese today), which has the same meaning.

The collective use of the name "Diaoyutai" to denote the entire island group began with the advent of the controversy in the 1970s.

=== Control of the islands by Japan and the US ===
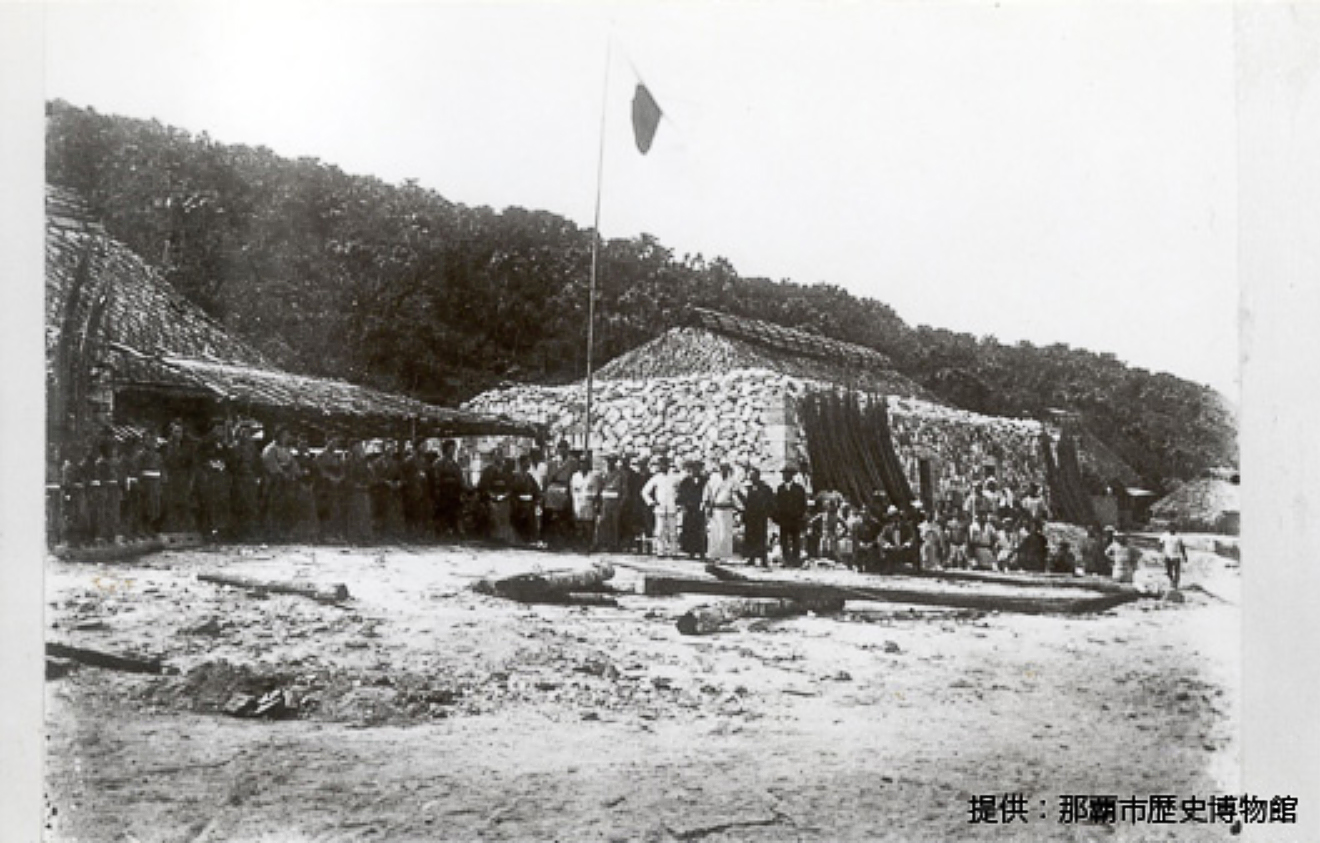
Japanese workers at a bonito fishery processing plant on Uotsuri-shima sometime around 1910

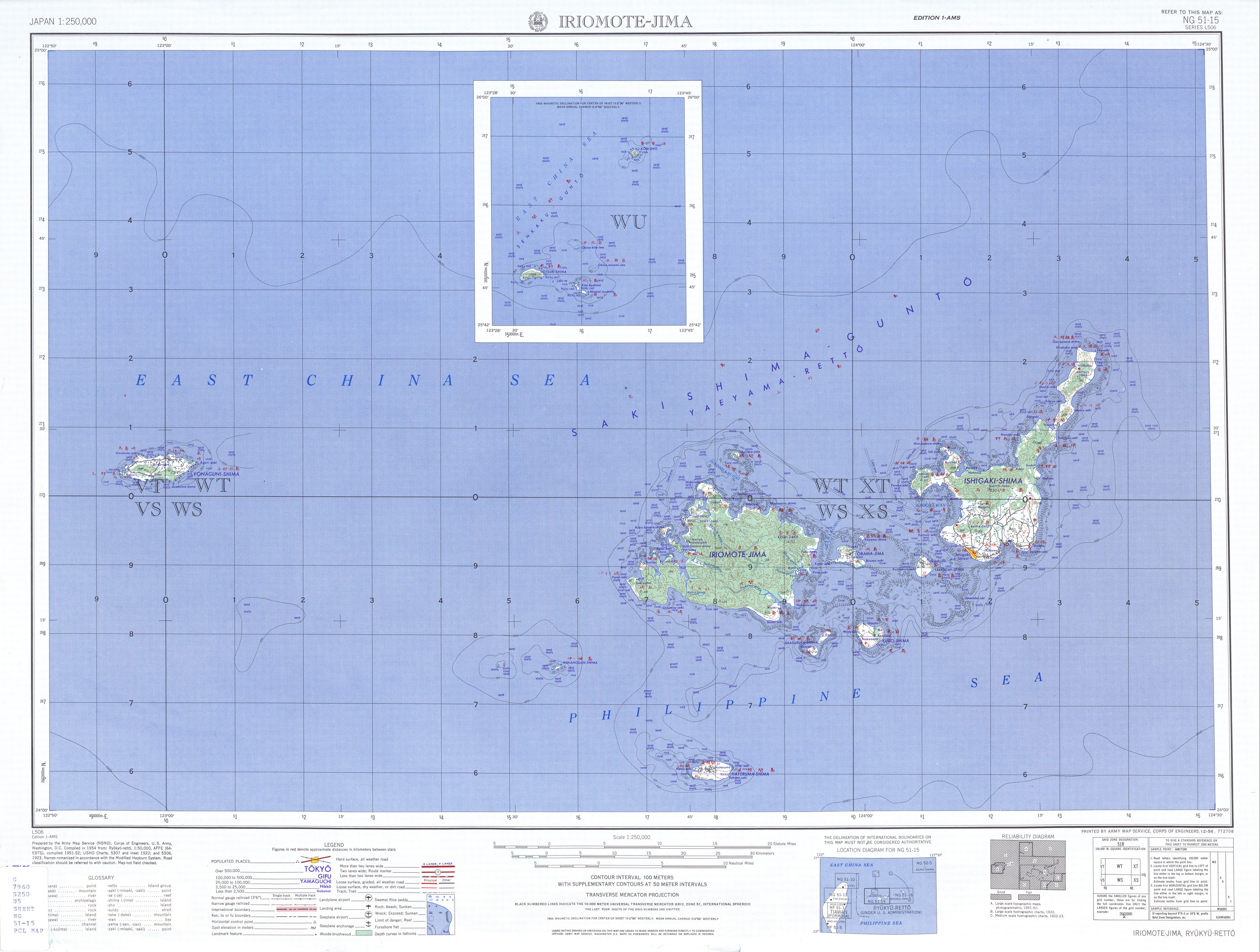
Map including Uotsuri-Shima (labeled as UOTSURI-SHIMA 魚釣島) (1954)

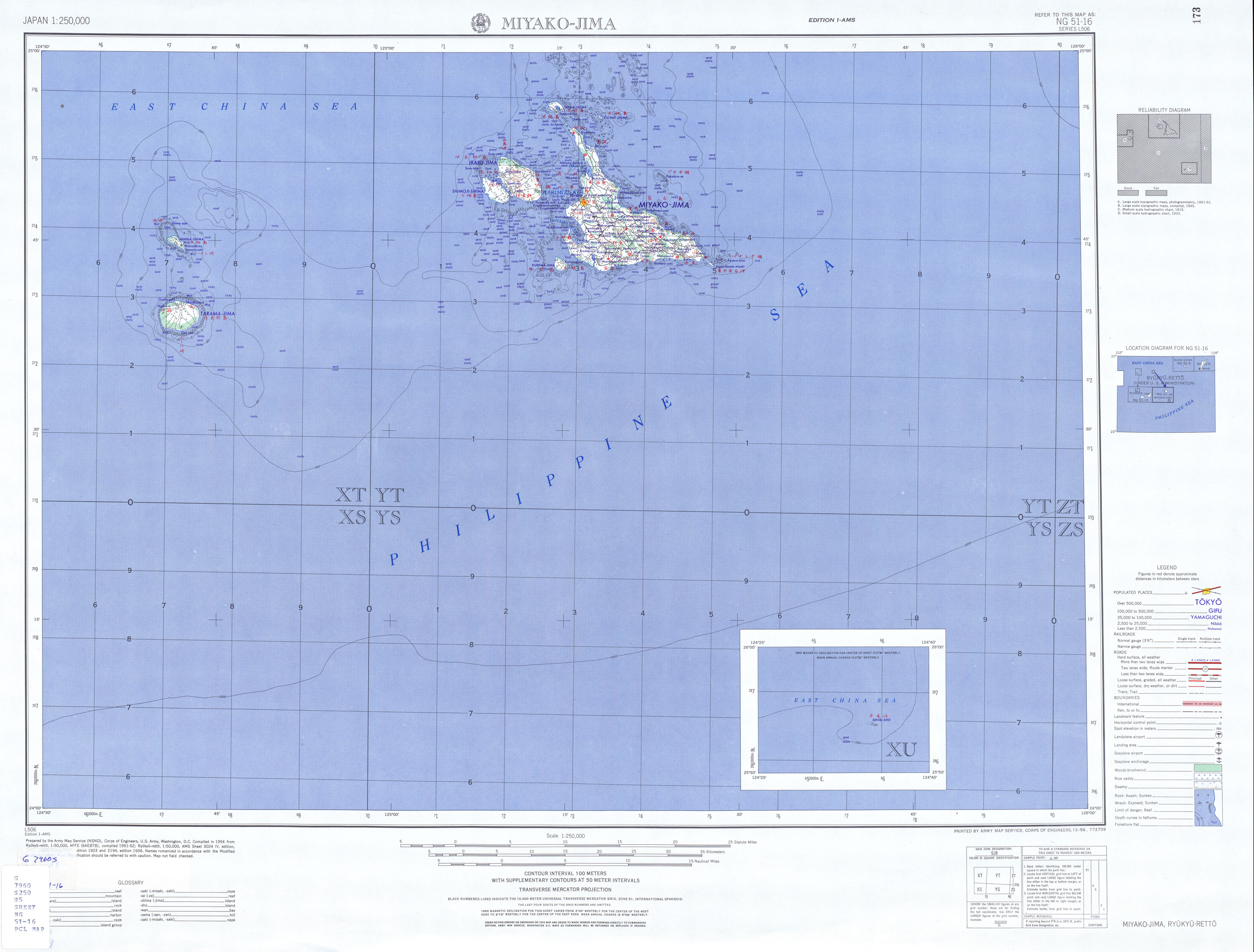
Map including Taishō-tō (labeled as SEKIBI-SHO 赤尾屿) (1954)

As the uninhabited islets were historically used as maritime navigational markers, they were never subjected to administrative control other than the recording of the geographical positions on maps, descriptions in official records of Chinese missions to the Ryukyu Kingdom, etc.

The Japanese central government incorporated the islands into Okinawa Prefecture in January 1895 while still fighting China in the First Sino-Japanese War. Around 1900, Japanese entrepreneur Koga Tatsushirō (古賀 辰四郎) constructed a bonito fish processing plant on the islands, employing over 200 workers. The business failed around 1940, and the islands have remained deserted ever since. In the 1970s, Koga Tatsushirō's son Zenji Koga and Zenji's wife Hanako sold four islets to the Kurihara family of Saitama Prefecture. Kunioki Kurihara owned Uotsuri, Kita-Kojima, and Minami-Kojima. Kunioki's sister owned Kuba.

The islands came under US government occupation in 1945 after the surrender of Japan ended World War II. In 1969, the United Nations Economic Commission for Asia and the Far East (ECAFE) identified potential oil and gas reserves in the vicinity of the Senkaku Islands. In 1971, the Okinawa Reversion Treaty passed the United States Senate, returning the islands to Japanese control in 1972. Also in 1972, the governments of the Republic of China (Taiwan) and the People's Republic of China each officially asserted sovereignty over the islands.

Since 1972, when the islands reverted to Japanese government control, the Ishigaki government has been granted civic authority over the territory. The Japanese central government, however, has prohibited Ishigaki from surveying or developing the islands.

In 1978, a Japanese political group constructed the first lighthouse on Uotsuri Island and grazed two goats. Since then, goats have proliferated, while affecting the island's vegetation.

In 1979, an official delegation from the Japanese government composed of 50 academics, government officials from the Foreign and Transport ministries, officials from the now-defunct Okinawa Development Agency, and Hiroyuki Kurihara, visited the islands and camped on Uotsuri for about four weeks. The delegation surveyed the local ecosystem, finding moles and sheep, studied the local marine life, and examined whether the islands would support human habitation.

In 1988, a Japanese political group reconstructed a lighthouse on Uotsuri Island.

In 2005, a Japanese fisherman who owned a lighthouse at Uotsuri Island expressed his intention to relinquish the ownership of the lighthouse, and the lighthouse became a national property pursuant to the provisions of the Civil Code of Japan. Since then, the Japan Coast Guard has maintained and managed the Uotsuri lighthouse.

From 2002 to 2012, the Ministry of Internal Affairs and Communications paid the Kurihara family ¥25 million a year to rent Uotsuri, Minami-Kojima, and Kita-Kojima. Japan's Ministry of Defense rents Kuba island for an undisclosed amount. Kuba is used by the US military as a practice aircraft bombing range. Japan's central government completely owns Taisho island.

On September 7, 2010, a Chinese fishing trawler collided with several Japanese Coast Guard (JCG) patrol boats in what became known as the 2010 Senkaku boat collision incident. Kan Cabinet's subsequent reaction to the incident (release of the detained Chinese crew members without any charges) was widely regarded as a diplomatic victory by China. On the other hand, the Japanese public attitudes were overwhelmingly negative, as they regarded the Japanese government's caving in to Chinese pressure as a shameful display of weakness, cowardice, and naive appeasement, with the former prime minister of Japan, Shinzo Abe, sharply criticizing the Kan cabinet's response, describing it as "a very foolish move" and "frighteningly naive".

On December 17, 2010, the city of Ishigaki designated January 14 as "Pioneering Day" to commemorate Japan's 1895 incorporation of the Senkaku Islands. China condemned Ishigaki's actions.

In May 2012, both the Tokyo Metropolitan and Japanese central governments announced plans to negotiate the purchase of Uotsuri, Kita-Kojima, and Minami-Kojima from the Kurihara family, and on September 11, 2012, the Japanese government nationalized its control over Minami-kojima, Kita-kojima, and Uotsuri islands by purchasing them from the Kurihara family for ¥2.05 billion. China's Foreign Ministry objected, saying Beijing would not "sit back and watch its territorial sovereignty violated."

In 2014, Japan constructed a lighthouse and wharf featuring Japanese flag insignia on the islets.

== Geography ==
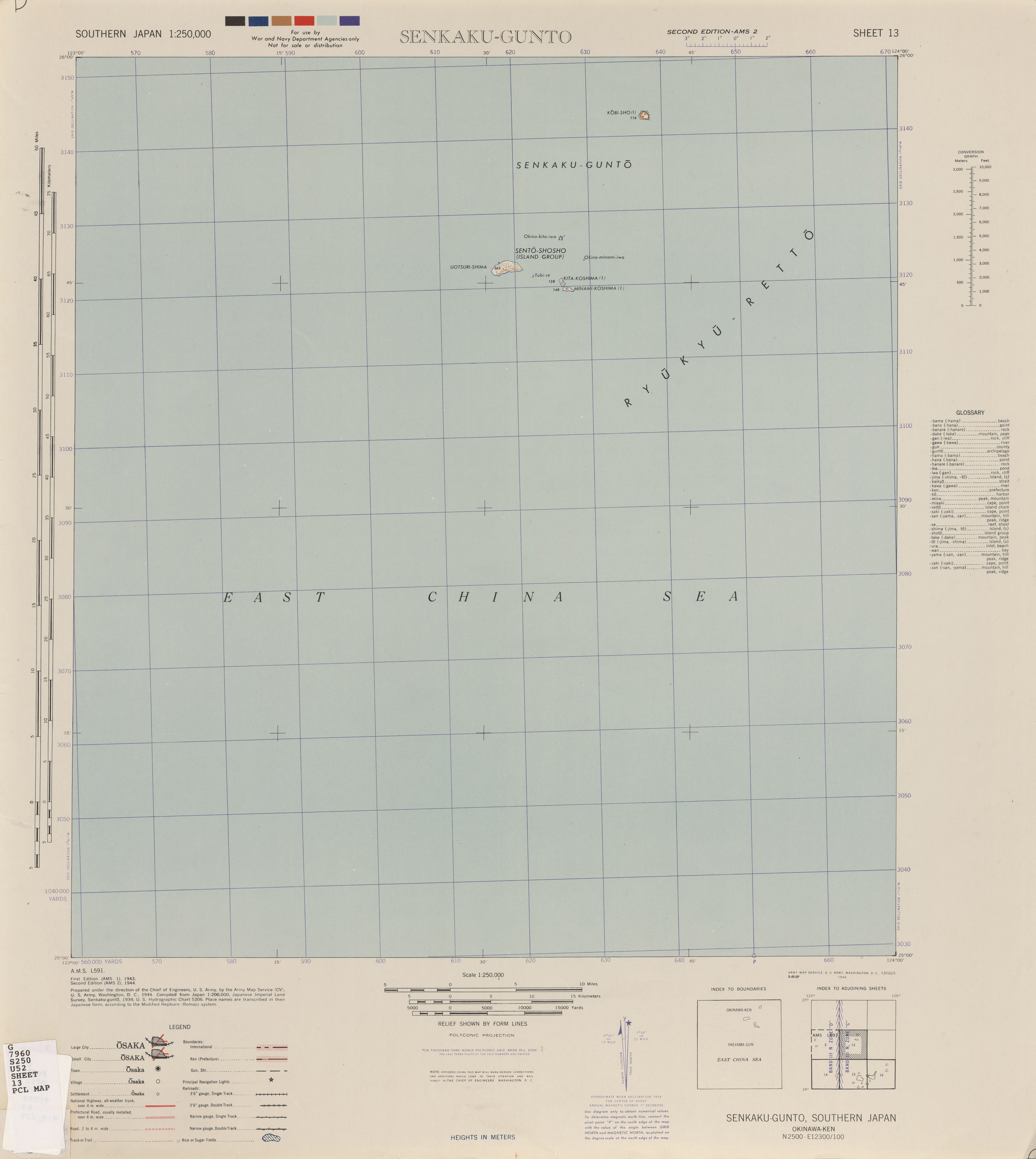
Map of the Senkaku Islands area (1944)

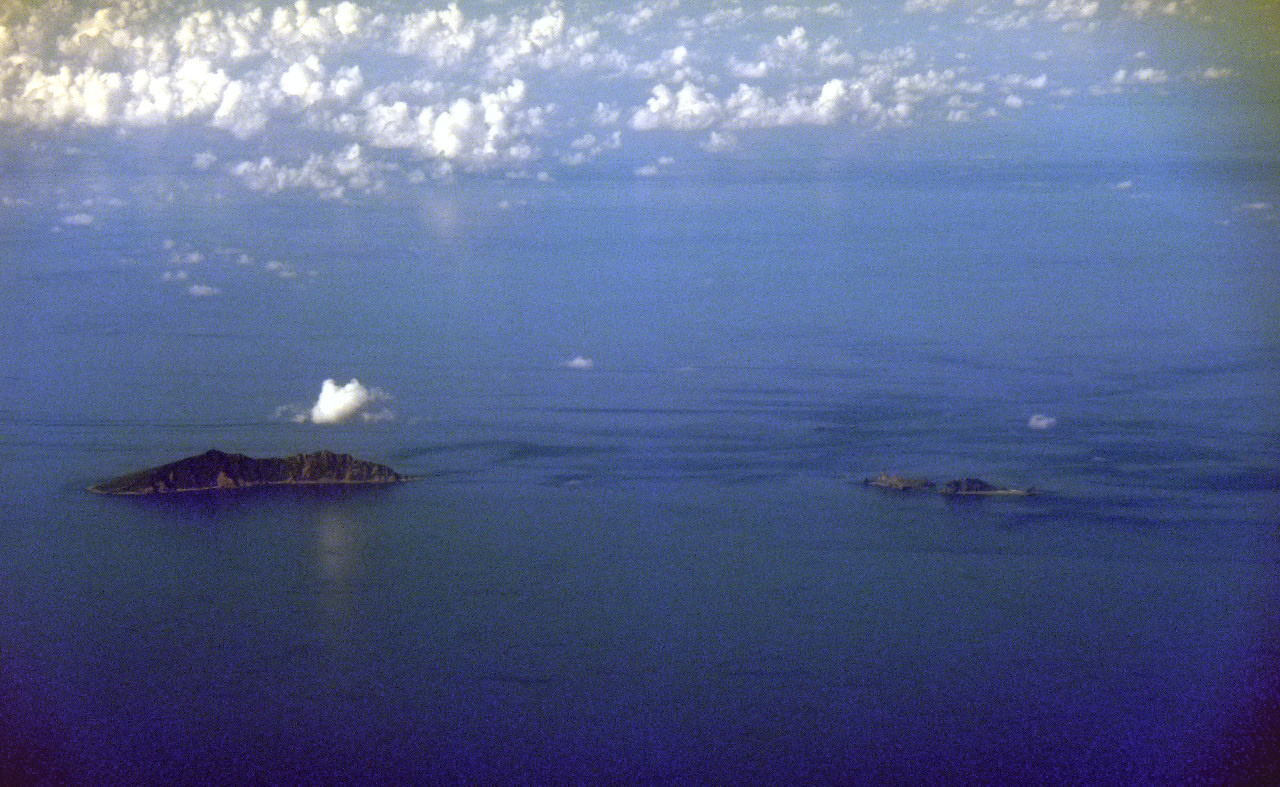
A cluster of islets – Uotsuri-shima (left), Kita-Kojima and Minami-Kojima (right)

The island group is known to consist of five uninhabited islets and three barren rocks. China has identified and named as many as 71 islets that belong to this group after the Japanese Cabinet released names for 39 uninhabited islands.

These minor features in the East China Sea are located approximately 120 nautical miles northeast of Taiwan, 200 nautical miles east of the mainland China, and 200 nautical miles southwest of the Japanese island of Okinawa.

According to one visitor, Uotsuri-shima, the largest of the islands, consists of a pair of rocky gray mountains with steep, boulder-strewn slopes rising almost straight from the water's edge. The other nearby islands were described as large rocks covered by low vegetation.

In ascending order of distances, the island cluster is located:

- 140 km (76 nmi; 87 mi) east of Pengjia Islet, Republic of China (Taiwan)
- 170 km (92 nmi; 110 mi) north of Ishigaki Island, Japan
- 186 km (100 nmi; 116 mi) northeast of Keelung, Republic of China (Taiwan)
- 410 km (220 nmi; 250 mi) west of Okinawa Island, Japan

Islands in the group
No.	Japanese name	Republic of China name	China (PRC) name	Coordinates	Area (km^{2})	Highest elevation (m)	Images
1	Uotsuri Island (魚釣島)	釣魚臺 / 釣魚台 Diaoyutai; POJ: Tiò-hî-tâi	Diaoyu Dao (钓鱼岛/釣魚島)	25°44′36″N 123°28′33″E	4.32	383	
2	Taisho Island (大正島)	赤尾嶼 Chiwei Isle	Chiwei Yu (赤尾屿/赤尾嶼)	25°55′21″N 124°33′31″E	0.0609	75	
3	Kuba Island (久場島)	黃尾嶼 Huangwei Isle	Huangwei Yu (黄尾屿/黄尾嶼)	25°55′26″N 123°40′55″E	1.08	117	
4	Kitakojima Island (北小島)	北小島 Beixiao Island	Beixiao Dao (北小岛/北小島)	25°43′47″N 123°32′29″E	0.3267	135	Kita-Kojima (left) and Minami-Kojima (right)
5	Minamikojima Island (南小島)	南小島 Nanxiao Island	Nanxiao Dao (南小岛/南小島)	25°43′25″N 123°33′00″E	0.4592	149	Kita-Kojima (left) and Minami-Kojima (right)
6	Okinokitaiwa Island (沖ノ北岩)	沖北岩 Chongbeiyan	Bei Yu (北屿/大北小岛/大北小島)	25°46′45″N 123°32′30″E	0.0183	nominal	
7	Okinominamiiwa Island (沖ノ南岩)	沖南岩 Chongnanyan	Nan Yu (南屿/大南小岛/大南小島/南岩)	25°45′19″N 123°34′01″E	0.0048	nominal	
8	Tobise Island (飛瀬)	飛瀨 Feilai	Fei Yu (飞屿/飞礁岩/飛礁岩)	25°44′08″N 123°30′22″E	0.0008	nominal	Tobise rocks (bottom right)

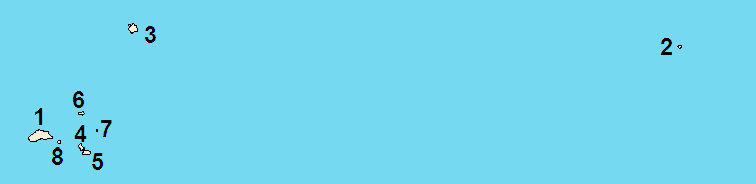
The five islands and three rocks, numbered for the table above.

The depth of the surrounding waters of the continental shelf is approximately 100–150 metres (330–490 ft) except for the Okinawa Trough on the south. The shelf is shallow enough that the western islands were likely connected to the mainland during the Last Glacial Period.

=== Geology ===
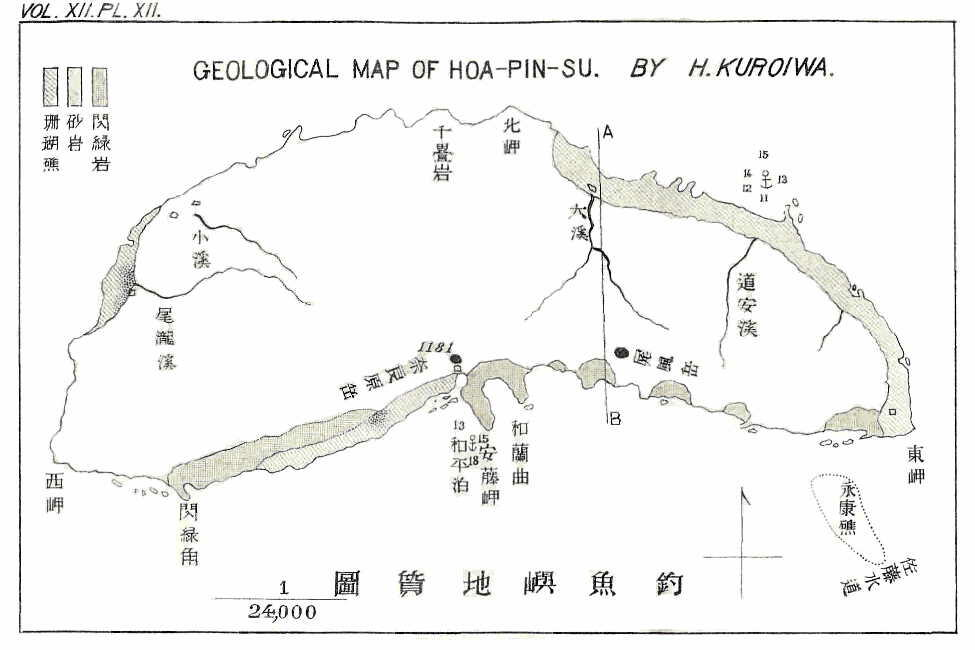
A geological map of Uotsuri-shima drawn by Japanese geologist Hisashi Kuroiwa in 1900.

Uotsuri, Kitakojima, Minamikojima and surrounding islets are sedimentary in origin, predominantly consisting of probably Miocene aged sandstone and sandstone-conglomerate, with subordinate conglomerate, coal seams up to 10 centimetres (3.9 in) thick, and rare siltstone beds. The sedimentary strata have around 300 metres (980 ft) of exposed thickness at Uotsuri, and have SW-NE, EW and NW-SE strikes, with a general inclination of a dip of less than 20 degrees towards the North. These strata are intruded by sheets of Mio-Pliocene porphyritic hornblende diorite, and are fringed by recent coral outcrops and surface talus deposits. Kuba and Taisho are volcanic in origin, with Kuba comprising "pyroxene andesite, lava, volcanic bombs, pumice, limestone, and other rocky material" and Taisho is thought to be consist of "andesite, tuff breccia, and tuffaceous sandstone".

== Wildlife ==
=== Plants ===
Permission for collecting herbs on three of the islands was recorded in an Imperial Chinese edict of 1893.

Several floral surveys have been conducted on the Senkaku islands, with a 1980 survey finding that Uotsuri had 339 species of plants. These ecological communities varied based on altitude, with the communities being divided into windswept mountaintop vegetation with Podocarpus macrophyllus trees, with the understory including Liriope muscari and Rhaphiolepis umbellata, inclined high forest including the palms Livistona chinensis and Arenga engleri, lowland windswept shrub forest including Ficus microcarpa and Planchonella obovata, and seashore plants. Minamikojima was much less diverse, and dominated by grasses, while Kitakojima only had sparse plant life. Kuba has a forest near the crater, which includes a variety of flora including Ceodes umbellifera, Macaranga tanarius, Ficus benjamina, Diospyros maritima, Trema orientalis, Machilus thunbergii, and Livistona subglobosa, with forest floor plants being sparse.

=== Animals ===
In an account by Hisashi Kuroiwa in 1900, it was noted the large number of birds present on the islands, tens of thousands of short-tailed and black-footed albatross would flock on Uotsuri-shima, in the colder months, while hundreds of thousands of sooty tern and brown noddy would descend on Kitakojima and Minamikojima in the warmer months. He also described the air of Uotsuri as swarming with bluebottle flies and mosquitoes. In the same year, an account by Miyajima Mikinosuke, surveying Kuba Island, noted the presence of whimbrel, Von Schrenck's bittern, the streaked shearwater, and the brown booby. Mikinosuke also noted the large number of chickens and feral cats on the island, with dozens of cats descending on the seabirds at night. Kitakojima and Minamikojima are one of only two significant breeding places of the rare short-tailed albatross (Phoebastria albatrus). The islands have been recognised as an Important Bird Area (IBA) by BirdLife International.

Uotsuri-shima, the largest island, has a number of endemic species such as the Senkaku mole (Mogera uchidai) and Okinawa-kuro-oo-ari ant. Due to the introduction of domestic goats to the island in 1978, the Senkaku mole is now an endangered species. The striped field mouse (Apodemus agrarius) has also been noted to be present on Uotsuri. Surveys from 1900 to 1953 and noted the presence of the Asian house shrew, black rats and fruit bats but these were not noted in more recent surveys.

Six species of reptile have been recorded from the islands, including Gekko hokouensis (Uotsuri, Minami) Eumeces elegans (Uotsuri, Minami), an indeterminate species of Scincella (Uotsuri) Ramphotyphlops braminus (Uotsuri) Elaphe carinata (Uotsuri) and Lycodon rufozonatus (Uotsuri).

Rich marine biodiversity adjacent to the islands has been recognized but poorly studied. Seemingly, varieties of larger fish and animals inhabit or migrate through the area, including tunas, sharks, marlins, critically endangered hawksbill sea turtles, dolphins, pilot whales, sperm whales, and humpback whales.

== Sovereignty dispute ==
Territorial sovereignty over the islands and the maritime boundaries around them are disputed between the People's Republic of China, the Republic of China, and Japan.

The People's Republic and the Republic of China claim that the islands have been a part of Chinese territory since at least 1534. China acknowledges that Japan took control of the islands in 1894–1895 during the first Sino-Japanese War, but maintains that they were ceded through the Treaty of Shimonoseki. China asserts that the Potsdam Declaration required that Japan relinquish control of all islands except for "the islands of Honshū, Hokkaidō, Kyūshū, Shikoku and such minor islands as we determine", and China states that this means control of the islands should pass to Republic of China. Both the People's Republic of China (PRC) and the Republic of China (ROC), respectively, separately claim sovereignty based on arguments that include the following points:

- Discovery and early recordings in maps and travelogues.
- The islands serving as China's frontier and an offshore defence against wokou (Japanese pirates) during the Ming and Qing dynasties (1368–1911).
- A Chinese map of Asia, as well as the Sangoku Tsūran Zusetsu map compiled by Japanese cartographer Hayashi Shihei in the 18th century, showing the islands as a part of China.
- Japan taking control of the islands in 1895 at the same time as the First Sino-Japanese War was happening. Furthermore, correspondence between Foreign Minister Inoue and Interior Minister Yamagata in 1885, warned against the erection of national markers and developing their land to avoid Qing Dynasty suspicions.
- The Potsdam Declaration stating that "Japanese sovereignty shall be limited to the islands of Honshū, Hokkaidō, Kyūshū, Shikoku and such minor islands as we determine", and "we" referred to the three nations that signed the Declaration (China, the United Kingdom, and the United States) and Japan's acceptance of the terms of the Declaration when it surrendered.
- China's formal protest of the 1971 US transfer of control to Japan.

Japan does not accept that there is a dispute, asserting that the islands are an integral part of Japan. Japan has rejected claims that the islands were under China's control prior to 1895, and that these islands were contemplated by the Potsdam Declaration or affected by the San Francisco Peace Treaty.

The stance given by the Japanese Ministry of Foreign Affairs is that the Senkaku Islands are clearly an inherent territory of Japan, in light of historical facts and based upon international law, and the Senkaku Islands are under the valid control of Japan. They also state "there exists no issue of territorial sovereignty to be resolved concerning the Senkaku Islands." The following points are given:

- The islands had been uninhabited and showed no trace of having been under the control of China prior to 1895.
- The purposes of maps and the intentions behind their creators can vary significantly, and the mere existence of an ancient map does not substantiate claims of territorial sovereignty. The map (1785) cited by China from Hayashi Shihei does not provide evidence that the creator's coloring was intended to indicate territorial sovereignty. This map also depicts Taiwan as only about one-third the size of Okinawa's main island, and it is colored differently from mainland China, which controlled Taiwan at the time. This suggests that the creator did not possess accurate knowledge.
- The islands were neither part of Taiwan nor part of the Pescadores Islands, which were ceded to Japan by the Qing Dynasty of China in Article II of the May 1895 Treaty of Shimonoseki, thus were not renounced by Japan under Article II of the San Francisco Peace Treaty, which serves as the international law addressing the aftermath of WW2.
- A resident of Okinawa Prefecture who had been engaging in activities such as fishery around the Senkaku Islands since around 1884 made an application for the lease of the islands, and approval was granted by the Meiji Government in 1896. After this approval, he sent a total of 248 workers to those islands and ran the following businesses: constructing piers, collecting bird feathers, manufacturing dried bonito, collecting coral, raising cattle, manufacturing canned goods, and collecting mineral phosphate guano (bird manure for fuel use). The fact that the Meiji Government gave approval concerning the use of the Senkaku Islands to an individual, who in turn was able to openly run these businesses mentioned above based on the approval, demonstrates Japan's valid control over the Islands.
- In May 1920, a thank-you letter from the Republic of China's consulate in Nagasaki regarding the rescue of Chinese fishermen in distress near the Senkaku Islands by Japanese fishermen included the notation "Senkaku Islands, Yaeyama District, Okinawa Prefecture, Empire of Japan."
- Although the United States controlled the islands as an occupying power between 1945 and 1972, Japan has effectively exercised administration over the islands since 1972.
- In 1953, the official Chinese newspaper People's Daily published an article that explicitly stated that the Ryukyu Islands consist of seven island groups, including the Senkaku Islands. Additionally, in the world atlas published by the China Map Press in 1958 (reprinted in 1960), these islands were clearly referred to as the "Senkaku Islands" and considered part of Okinawa.
- The Republic of China and the People's Republic of China only started claiming ownership of the islands in 1971, following a May 1969 United Nations report that a large oil and gas reserve may exist under the seabed near the islands.

In 2012, the Japanese Ministry of Foreign Affairs created a webpage in support of its claims. Separately, in a 2012 government statement, Beijing declared the territorial-sea baselines for the Diaoyu Islands and their affiliated islets, framing the claimed 12-nautical-mile waters around the group. In late 2014, the National Marine Data and Information Service, a department under the State Oceanic Administration of China, created a website of its own to support its claims.

On June 22, 2020, the Ishigaki City Council voted to change the name of the area containing the Senkaku Islands from "Tonoshiro" to "Tonoshiro Senkaku". The Republic of China's Ministry of Foreign Affairs responded that the islands belong to the Republic of China, and any moves to deny this fact are invalid. The Taiwanese government and the opposition KMT party also condemned the council's move, saying the Islands are ROC territory and the nation would not give up even "an inch" of its sovereignty.

=== United States' position ===
The official and successive US position takes no stance on the ultimate sovereignty. The US previously recognized Japan's sovereignty over the Senkaku Islands from 1895 to 1972. However, during the 1971–72 reversion debate, the US adopted an ambiguous policy, stating that it could only return to Japan what it had originally received, namely, administrative rights, not sovereignty. Accordingly, the Okinawa Reversion Agreement was structured to transfer administrative rights only and “does not affect the legal status” of the islands' sovereignty; successive US administrations have taken no position on ultimate sovereignty, while treating the controversy as a matter for the parties to resolve.

"The United States believes that a return of administrative rights over those islands to Japan, from which the rights were received, can in no way prejudice any underlying claims. The United States cannot add to the legal rights Japan possessed before it transferred administration of the islands to us, nor can the United States, by giving back what it received, diminish the rights of other claimants. The United States has made no claim to the Senkaku Islands and considers that any conflicting claims to the islands are a matter for resolution by the parties concerned."

Both the Republic of China (Taiwan) and the People’s Republic of China protested the inclusion of the islets in the reversion arrangements and asserted their own claims: on March 15, 1971 the ROC submitted a note verbale in Washington asserting that Diaoyutai is ROC territory, to which the US replied that returning administrative rights to Japan would not affect ROC's sovereignty claims; PRC statements likewise rejected the reversion and asserted that Diaoyu Dao is China’s territory.

=== Post-2012 escalation ===
Since the 2012 flare-up, China has significantly increased its maritime and air activities surrounding the islands aimed at undermining Japan's long-standing physical control, prompting reciprocal responses from Japan. Chinese vessels have increasingly entered the contiguous zone adjacent to the territorial waters around the Senkaku Islands, with near-daily frequency, prompting the Japan Coast Guard to respond by consistently shadowing and issuing warnings. In 2013, China also established an East China Sea ADIZ that includes the airspace over the Senkaku Islands, which drew protests from Japan and was widely analyzed by international security sources.

In August 2016, the Japanese foreign minister Fumio Kishida told China's foreign minister Wang Yi "that the activity represented an escalation of tensions." It was the first meeting of the top diplomats since the Permanent Court of Arbitration ruling against China's South China Sea claims and was coincident with a three-party meeting (including South Korea) relative to a North Korean submarine-launched missile in the Sea of Japan.

The maritime campaign of China has intensified since 2019, with its vessels attempting to harass Japanese fishing boats, while the China Coast Guard gained legal authority in 2021 to fire on foreign ships.

In 2024, media reporting based on Japan Coast Guard statistics described a near year-round presence of Chinese government vessels in the contiguous zone (355 days) and dozens of territorial-sea entries; The Diplomat reported 42 such days, while Stars and Stripes cited Japan Coast Guard figures of 39 incursions within 12 nautical miles that year. On 21–March 24, 2025, four China Coast Guard vessels remained inside waters claimed by Japan for a record 92 hours and 8 minutes, according to contemporary reports citing Japan Coast Guard releases. In May 2025, Japan and China exchanged accusations of an airspace violation near the islands following a China Coast Guard helicopter flight; both sides lodged protests. Short-duration entries into waters claimed by Japan continued later in 2025, according to Jiji Press bulletins. More generally, wire-service reporting has chronicled routine instances in which the China Coast Guard announces patrols around the Diaoyu Islands while the Japan Coast Guard issues warnings for Chinese vessels to leave waters claimed by Japan. On January 27, 2026, Reuters reported that since late 2025, the Japanese government had been advising fishers to avoid the Senkaku Islands in order to not escalate relations with China.

== See also ==
- Uninhabited island
- Yonaguni island – Japan's westernmost inhabited island
- Hateruma island – Japan's southernmost inhabited island
- List of islands

== External link ==
- "Senkaku Islands". The National Museum of Territory and Sovereignty, Cabinet Secretariat (Japan).
