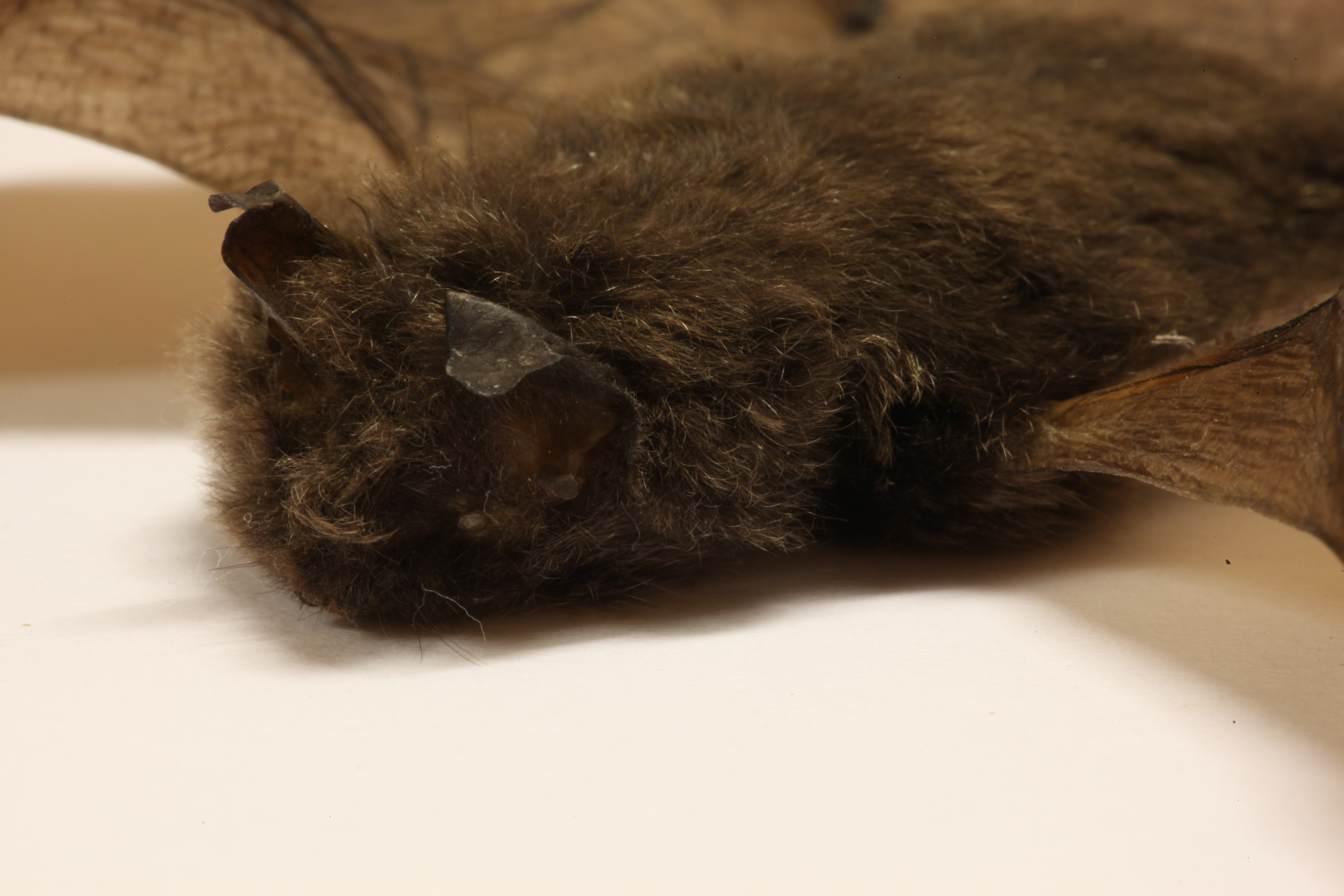

Conservation status
- Least Concern (IUCN 3.1)

Scientific classification
- Kingdom: Animalia
- Phylum: Chordata
- Class: Mammalia
- Order: Chiroptera
- Family: Vespertilionidae
- Genus: Myotis
- Species: M. secundus

Binomial name
- Myotis secundus Ruedi, Csorba, Lin, & Chou, 2015

= Long-toed myotis =

Species of vesper bat

The long-toed myotis or Taiwan long-toed myotis (Myotis secundus) is a species of vesper bat endemic to Taiwan.

It was first discovered by scientists in 2003, and described in a 2015 study of the phylogenetics of Myotis bats from Taiwan and eastern China. It is thought to be closely related to the Yanbaru whiskered bat (M. yanbarensis) of the Ryukyu Islands. Its specific epithet, secundus, references to it being the second (at the time) and undescribed Myotis known from Taiwan, the other being the reddish myotis (M. soror), which was later described alongside M. secundus. Despite its name, the long toes are not particularly distinctive compared to other Myotis species.

It is widespread throughout Taiwan, where it inhabits forested areas in both the mountains and eastern lowlands. It is not thought to be particularly threatened, and is thus classified as Least Concern by the IUCN Red List.
