= John David Digues La Touche =

Irish ornithologist, naturalist, and zoologist (1861–1935)

- Born: 5 June 1861; Tours, France
- Died: 6 May 1935 (aged 73)
- Relatives: Myles Dillon (son-in-law); John M. Dillon (grandson)

John David Digues La Touche (5 June 1861 – 6 May 1935) was an Irish ornithologist, naturalist, and zoologist. La Touche's career was as a customs official in China.

== Early life and education ==
La Touche was born in Tours, Indre-et-Loire, France, to Charles John La Touche of Marlay House, Dublin, and Marie Rose Apolline de Fouchier of Mirebeau (1829–1908), from a noble Poitevin family. The La Touche family of Ireland are of Huguenot descent, descended from David Digues de la Touche (1671–1745) who fled Blois after the Edict of Fontainebleau.

La Touche was educated at Downside School, in Somerset.

== Career ==
La Touche entered the Imperial Maritime Customs Service in China in 1882.

During his time in China, he made extensive ornithological observations and collections, resulting in many important publications. Notably, he wrote A Handbook of the Birds of Eastern China, consisting of two volumes and altogether ten parts that were published in 1925–1934 (Taylor & Francis, London). He also made other collections, including reptiles and amphibians.

In 1921, he retired to Dublin and later lived in Newtownmountkennedy, County Wicklow.

La Touche's free-tailed bat, La Touche's mole, and La Touche's frog are named after him. A species of Chinese snake, Opisthotropis latouchii, is named in his honour. Also, a genus of spider Latouchia in the family Halonoproctidae was presumably named after him as co-collector of the Chinese type species, alongside fellow naturalist Mr. C.B. Rickett. Else, a genus of flowering plants from China named Latouchea, belonging to the family Gentianaceae can also be an honorific as collected by both La Touche and his wife. The specific epithet of fokienensis resembles the maiden name of La Touche's wife, née Caroline Dawson Focken (1871–1945). However Fokien is a historical name for the Fujian region of China, and the -ensis denotes being "of/from a place". This uses the Latin nominative case, together meaning "of/from Fokien". For honorific species names involving people, in contrast. The genitive case of Latin is typically used.

== Works ==
- Further Notes on the Birds of the Province of Fohkien in South-east China (1917)
