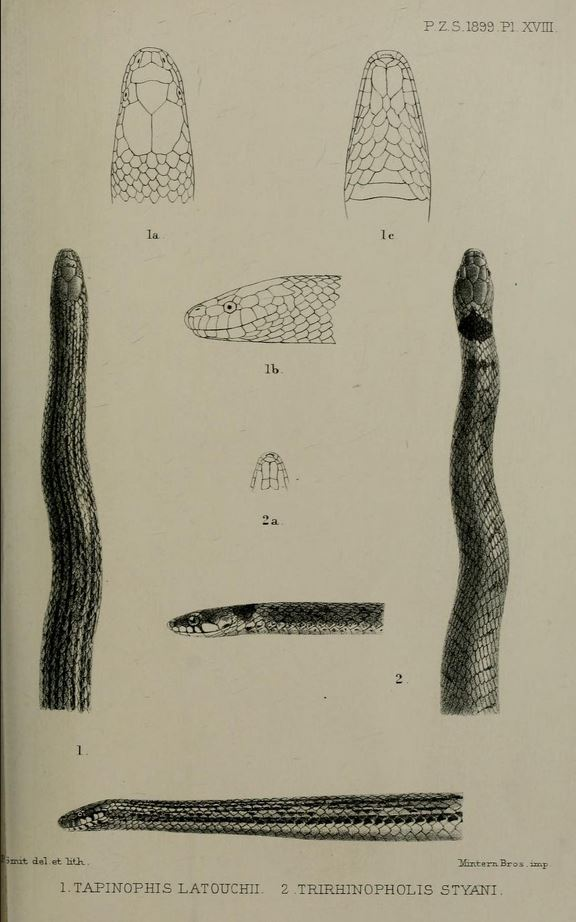

Conservation status
- Least Concern (IUCN 3.1)

Scientific classification
- Kingdom: Animalia
- Phylum: Chordata
- Class: Reptilia
- Order: Squamata
- Suborder: Serpentes
- Family: Colubridae
- Genus: Opisthotropis
- Species: O. latouchii

Binomial name
- Opisthotropis latouchii (Boulenger, 1899)

Synonyms
- Tapinophis latouchii Boulenger, 1899; Cantonophis praefrontalis F. Werner, 1909

= Opisthotropis latouchii =

Species of snake

Opisthotropis latouchii, also known commonly as the Sichuan mountain keelback, is a species of snake in the subfamily Natricinae of the family Colubridae. The species is endemic to China.

== Etymology ==
O. latouchii is named after French-born Irish naturalist John David Digues La Touche, who worked in China as a customs inspector for many years.

== Geographic range ==
O. latouchii is found in southeastern China.

== Habitat ==
The preferred natural habitat of O. latouchii is freshwater streams, but it is also found in rice paddies and irrigation ditches.

== Behavior ==
O. latouchii is nocturnal.

== Diet ==
O. latouchii preys upon aquatic worms, earthworms, freshwater shrimp, fishes, tadpoles, and frogs.

== Reproduction ==
O. latouchii is oviparous. In Fujian adult females lay eggs in August.
