= La Touche's mole =

Scientific classification
- Kingdom: Animalia
- Phylum: Chordata
- Class: Mammalia
- Order: Eulipotyphla
- Family: Talpidae
- Genus: Mogera
- Species: M. latouchei

Binomial name
- Mogera latouchei Thomas, 1907
- La Touche's mole range

Synonyms
- Mogera insularis latouchei

Species of mammal

La Touche's mole (Mogera latouchei) is a species of mammal in the family Talpidae. It is found in eastern China and parts of northern Vietnam. It is named after Irish naturalist John David Digues La Touche.

It was formerly considered a subspecies of the insular mole (M. insularis) of Hainan Island and eastern Taiwan (or alternatively just eastern Taiwan), but a 2007 genetic analysis found both species to be distinct from one another. Phylogenetic analysis indicates that M. latouchei is a sister species to a clade comprising the 2-3 island-endemic Mogera species from China and Taiwan (M. insularis, M. kanoana, and M. hainana if the latter is considered distinct from insularis).

Diagnostic characteristics of the species are its small size, dark fur, and wide auditory opening in the skull, the latter of which is distinct from any other Mogera species. Specimens of M. latouchei from Vietnam and China have similar skeletal characteristics, but Vietnamese populations are thought to be larger and have a more robust skull; this could potentially indicate the presence of a cryptic species within the M. latouchei lineage

In Vietnam, M. latouchei has a peripatric distribution with respect to the long-nosed mole (Euroscaptor longirostris), with La Touche's mole being found at low elevations from 600 to 800 meters, including in farmland, and the long-nosed mole only being found above 800 meters. This indicates that both species may be competitors with one another.
