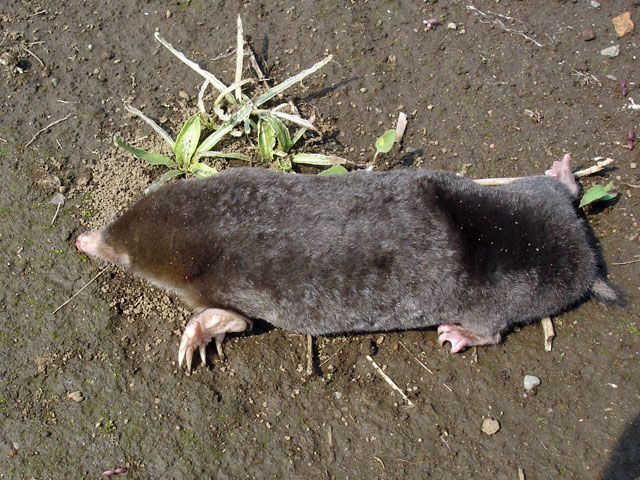
- Small Japanese mole (Mogera imaizumii)

Scientific classification
- Kingdom: Animalia
- Phylum: Chordata
- Class: Mammalia
- Order: Eulipotyphla
- Family: Talpidae
- Tribe: Talpini
- Genus: Mogera; Pomel, 1848

Type species
- Talpa wogura Temminck, 1842

Species
- See text

Synonyms
- Nesoscaptor Abe, Shiraishi and Arai, 1991

= Mogera =

Genus of mammals

Mogera is a genus of mole in the tribe Talpini. They are native to East Asia.

== Species ==
The genus contains the following species:

- Echigo mole (Mogera etigo)
- Small Japanese mole (Mogera imaizumii)
- Insular mole (Mogera insularis)
- Kano's mole (Mogera kanoana)
- La Touche's mole (Mogera latouchei)
- Ussuri mole (Mogera robusta)
- Sado mole (Mogera tokudae)
- Senkaku mole (Mogera uchidai)
- Japanese mole (Mogera wogura)

== Description ==
Moles in this genus differ from Old World moles in the genus Talpa in having one fewer pairs of lower incisors and in having larger hind premolars in the lower jaw.

Moles of this genus vary in size. Kawada (2016) made a morphological revision of the Japanese mountain mole and proposed the actual position of this species (then known as Euroscaptor mizura) in Oreoscaptor. In this study, the author presented and compared morphometrics of [O]. mizura with 17 other species of talpids, which included 8 species of the genus Mogera. Some information from this study on their head-body length and tail length (in millimeters) and their weight (in grams) are presented in the table below.

Basic morphometrics values of some species of the genus Mogera.
Species	Numbers of individuals (n)	Head-Body Length (X, mm)	Head-Body Length (Range, mm)	Tail Length (X, mm)	Tail Length (Range, mm)	Weight (X, grams)	Weight (Range, grams)
M. etigo	13	164.62	157.0 - 170.5	26.04	23.0 - 29.5	123.40	94.9 - 161.5
M. imaizumii	97	126.64	102.0 - 154.0	15.93	8.5 - 22.5	58.74	36.31 - 109.1
M. insularis	12	130.09	112.0 - 139.5	9.32	6.5 - 11.5	57.74	42.0 - 72.5
M. kanoana	11	121.91	113.0 - 133.5	11.09	8.5 - 13.5	39.91	23.5 - 59.0
M. latouchei	17	122.26	116.0 - 130.0	13.94	12.0 - 16.0	39.56	33.0 - 51.8
M. robusta	5	154.10	147.0 - 165.0	18.10	16.0 - 20.5	108.62	95.9 - 127.3
M. tokudae	5	145.92	131.5 - 163.0	26.12	23.0 - 27.5	102.60	82.5 - 120.5
M. wogura	201	158.76	123.0 - 180.0	19.14	11.5 - 29.0	117.25	62.9 - 178.0
