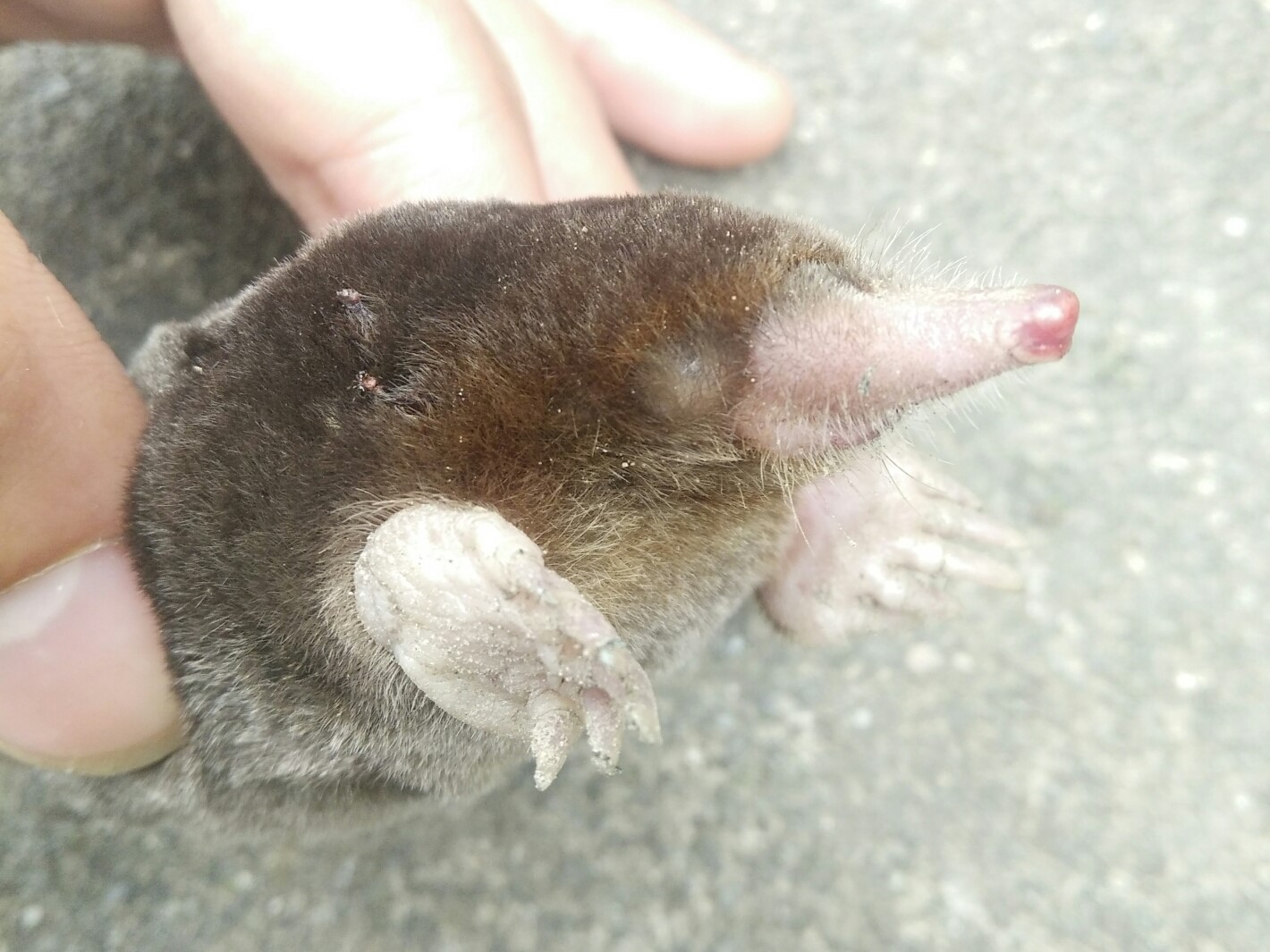

Scientific classification
- Kingdom: Animalia
- Phylum: Chordata
- Class: Mammalia
- Order: Eulipotyphla
- Family: Talpidae
- Genus: Mogera
- Species: M. kanoana

Binomial name
- Mogera kanoana Kawada et al., 2007
- Kano's mole range

= Kano's mole =

Species of mammal

Kano's mole (Mogera kanoana) is a species of mole endemic to Taiwan. The specific name kanoana is derived from Tadao Kano, a Japanese naturalist who made the first record of these animals in 1940s.

It is found in the mountainous center and the lowlands of southern and eastern Taiwan. In contrast, the insular mole (M. insularis), the only other mole in Taiwan, is restricted to the western lowlands of the island.

The existence of the species was first noted in 1936, when Kyukichi Kishida noted that two distinct forms of mole occurred in the lowlands and mountains of Taiwan, naming the mountain form yamazimogura. Although Kishida's research was not fully accepted, Tadao Kano described the mountain species in 1940 as Mogera montana; however, due to a lack of a type specimen and lack of sufficient detail in description, it was not accepted. From 2001 to 2003, biologists from Japan and Taiwan collected several specimens from across the island and confirmed the distinctiveness of this species.
