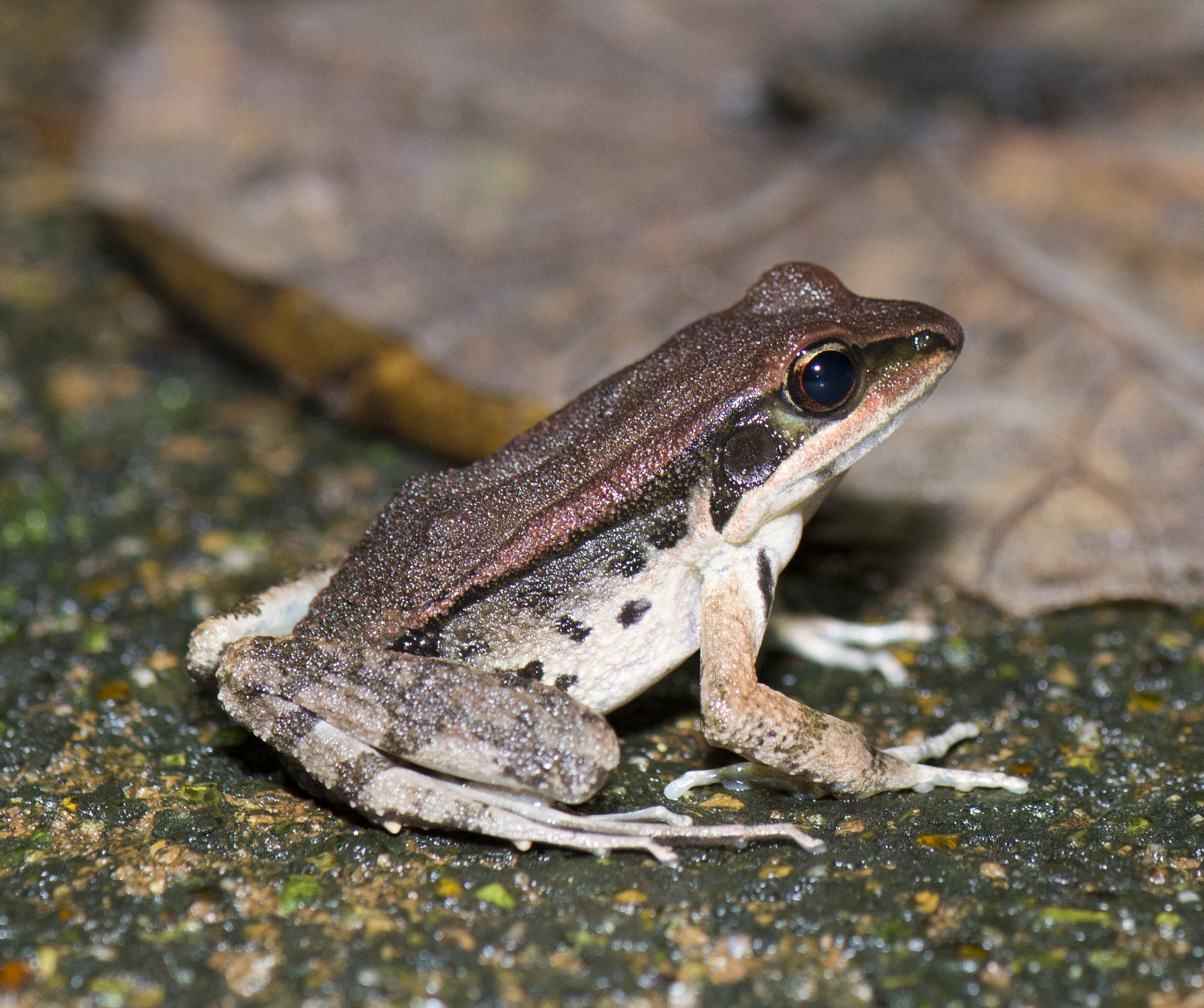

Conservation status
- Least Concern (IUCN 3.1)

Scientific classification
- Kingdom: Animalia
- Phylum: Chordata
- Class: Amphibia
- Order: Anura
- Family: Ranidae
- Genus: Hylarana
- Species: H. latouchii

Binomial name
- Hylarana latouchii (Boulenger, 1899)

Synonyms
- Rana latouchii Boulenger, 1899; Sylvirana latouchii (Boulenger, 1899)

= Hylarana latouchii =

Species of amphibian

Hylarana latouchii, also known as Kuatun frog, La Touche's frog, or broad-folded frog, is a species of frog in the family Ranidae. It was formerly placed in genus Rana. The specific name honours the collector of the type series: "Hylarana" latouchii was described by George Albert Boulenger based on three specimens collected by Irish ornithologist John D. La Touche in Guadun village in Wuyishan, Fujian, China.

Hylarana latouchii is found in southern and eastern China and Taiwan. Frogs from Taiwan might represent a separate species different from the mainland. Its natural habitats are subtropical or tropical moist lowland forests, moist montane forests, rivers, freshwater marshes, intermittent freshwater marshes, water storage areas, ponds, open excavations, irrigated land, and canals and ditches. It is not considered a threatened species by the IUCN.

Hylarana latouchii is a small frog that may grow up to 4 cm (1.6 in) in snout-vent length. Males are smaller (38 mm (1.5 in) SVL) than females (47 mm (1.9 in) SVL). Mean sizes reported for Taiwanese Hylarana latouchii are larger, respectively 44 mm (1.7 in) and 55 mm (2.2 in) SVL. Hylarana latouchii is reproductively active throughout the year in Taiwan.

Antimicrobial peptides can be isolated from skin of Hylarana latouchii.
