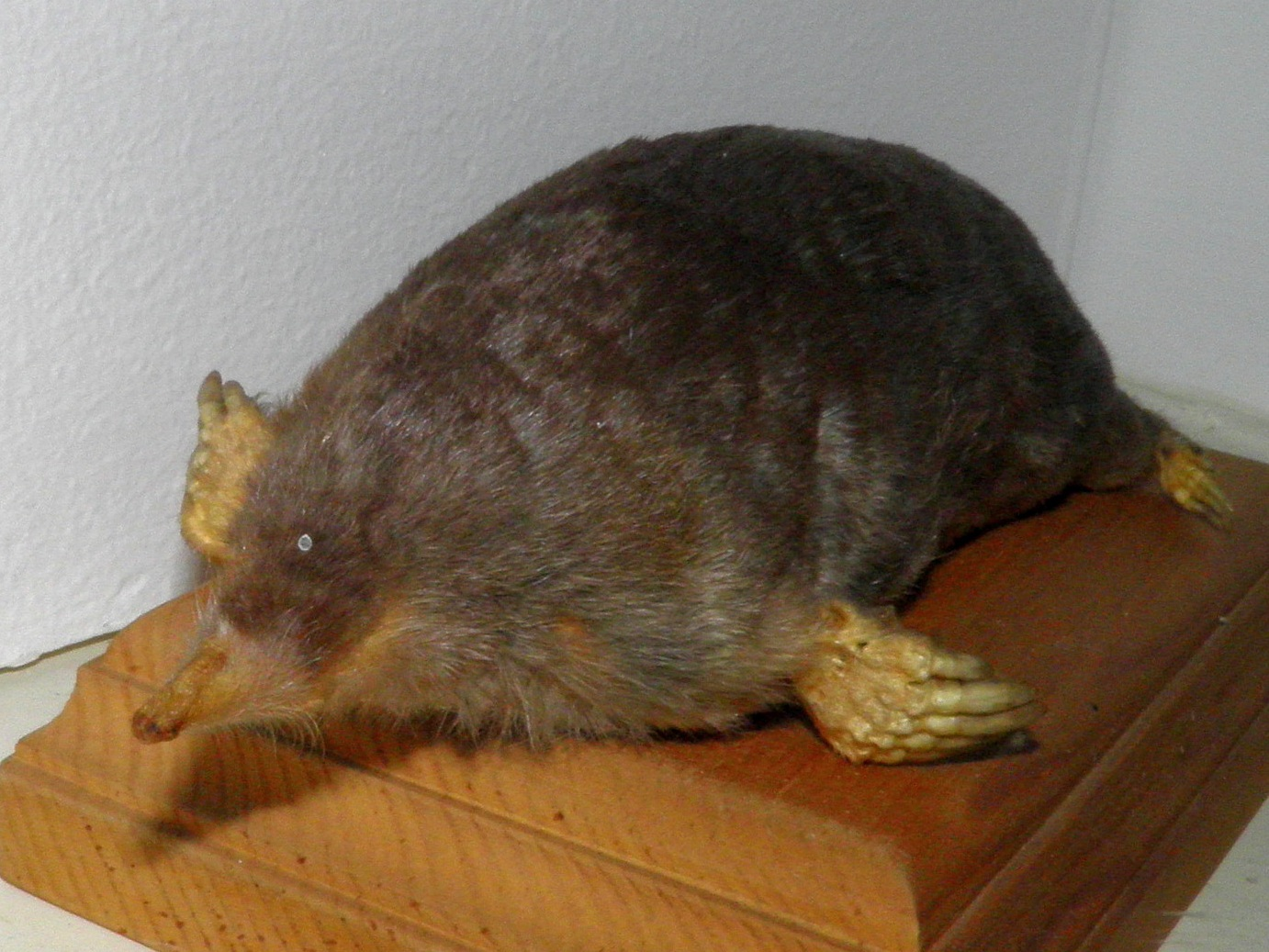

Conservation status
- Least Concern (IUCN 3.1)

Scientific classification
- Kingdom: Animalia
- Phylum: Chordata
- Class: Mammalia
- Order: Eulipotyphla
- Family: Talpidae
- Genus: Mogera
- Species: M. wogura

Binomial name
- Mogera wogura (Temminck, 1842)
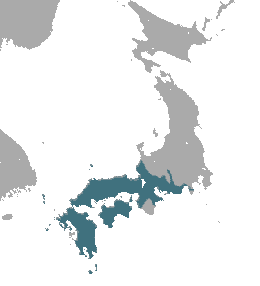
- Japanese mole range

Synonyms
- Mogera kobeae Thomas, 1905

= Japanese mole =

Species of mammal

The Japanese mole (Mogera wogura; 土竜 or コウベモグラ, lit. "Earth Dragon"), also known as large Japanese mole or Temminck's mole, is a species of mole endemic to Japan. A solitary and diurnal species, it can live for up to 3.5 years in the wild. Their sizes vary depending on the temperature and the hardness of the soil they reside in.

== Taxonomy ==
The Kobe mole (M. kobeae) was formerly described as a distinct species, but is now known to be conspecific with M. wogura.

This species has shown signs of genetic drift through either paripatric or peripatric speciation. This conclusion has been reached due to the dental anomalies found within the Japanese Mole populations, depending on the region where the Japanese mole is found.

M. wogura is believed to have derived from the arrival of its ancestor to Japan around 0.1 to 0.01 MYA. This was around the last recorded glacial period.

== Locomotion ==
The Japanese mole uses two methods of locomotion: crawling and burrowing, which provide an insight into its highly evolved mechanism of strong neural control. The Japanese mole's neural connections in its thoracic and lumbar vertebrate have an extremely strong connection with its fore and hindlimbs, which aid it in locomotion. They use these skills to remove piles of loose dirt through stroke-like movements compared to that of swimming.
