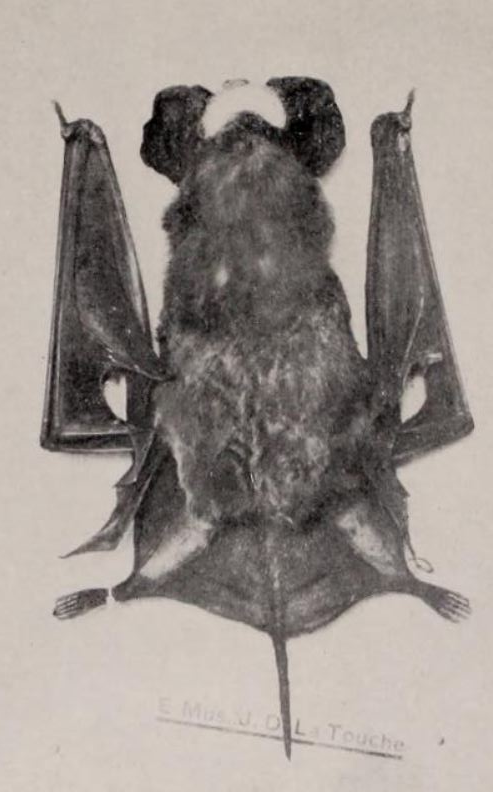

Conservation status
- Endangered (IUCN 3.1)

Scientific classification
- Kingdom: Animalia
- Phylum: Chordata
- Class: Mammalia
- Order: Chiroptera
- Family: Molossidae
- Genus: Tadarida
- Species: T. latouchei

Binomial name
- Tadarida latouchei Thomas, 1920
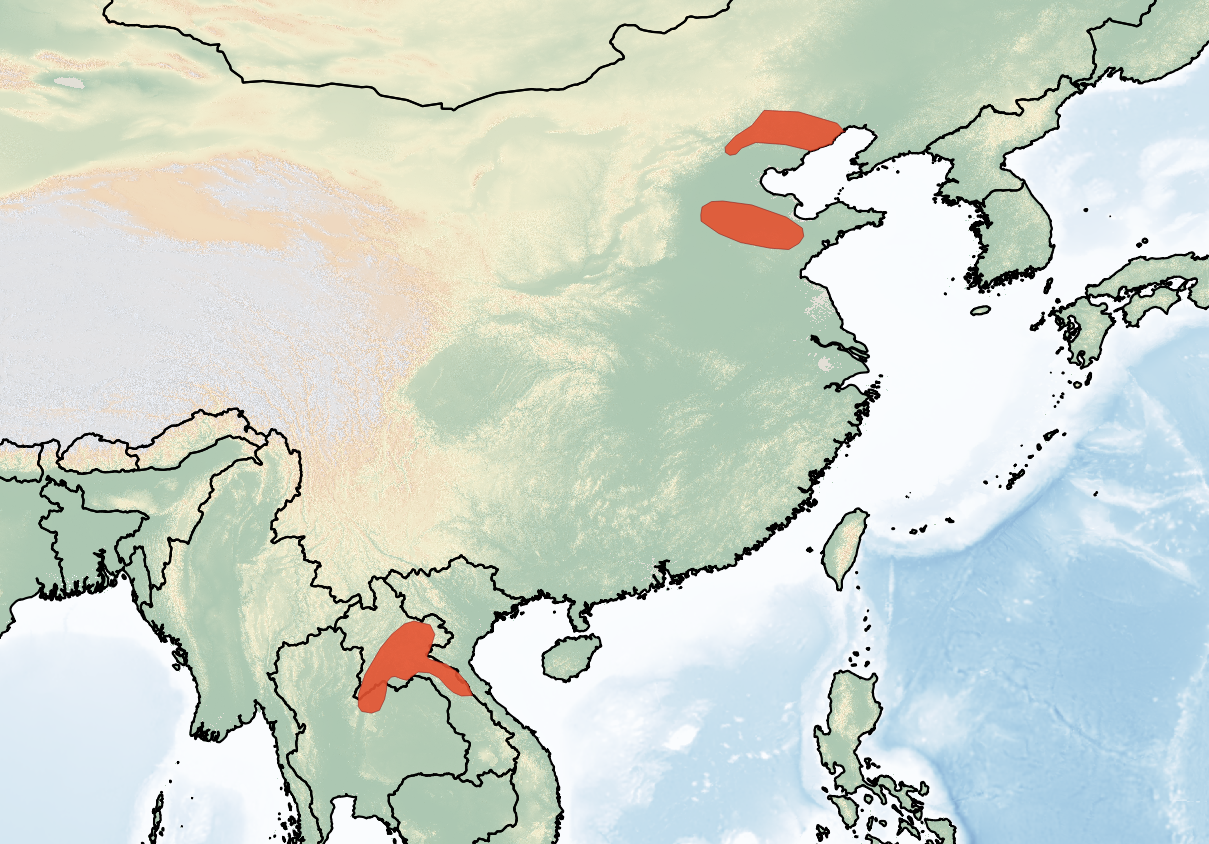

= La Touche's free-tailed bat =

Species of bat

The La Touche's free-tailed bat (Tadarida latouchei) is a species of bat in the family Molossidae. It is found in China, Japan, and Thailand. It is named after Irish naturalist John David Digues La Touche.
