= Latouchea =

Scientific classification
- Kingdom: Plantae
- Clade: Tracheophytes
- Clade: Angiosperms
- Clade: Eudicots
- Clade: Asterids
- Order: Gentianales
- Family: Gentianaceae
- Genus: Latouchea; Franch.
- Species: L. fokienensis

Binomial name
- Latouchea fokienensis Franch.

Genus of plants

Latouchea is a monotypic genus of flowering plants belonging to the family Gentianaceae. It only contains one species, Latouchea fokienensis. It is native to southern China.

The genus name of Latouchea is in honour of John David Digues La Touche (1861–1935) an Irish ornithologist, naturalist, and zoologist as well as his wife, who both collected botanical specimens. The specific epithet of fokienensis resembles the maiden name of La Touche's wife, née Caroline Dawson Focken (1871–1945). However Fokien is a historical name for the Fujian region of China, and the -ensis denotes being "of/from a place". This uses the latin nominative case, together meaning "of/from Fokien". For honorific species names involving people, in contrast. the genitive case of latin is typically used.

Both genus and species were first described and published in Bull. Soc. Bot. France Vol.46 on page 212 in 1899.
