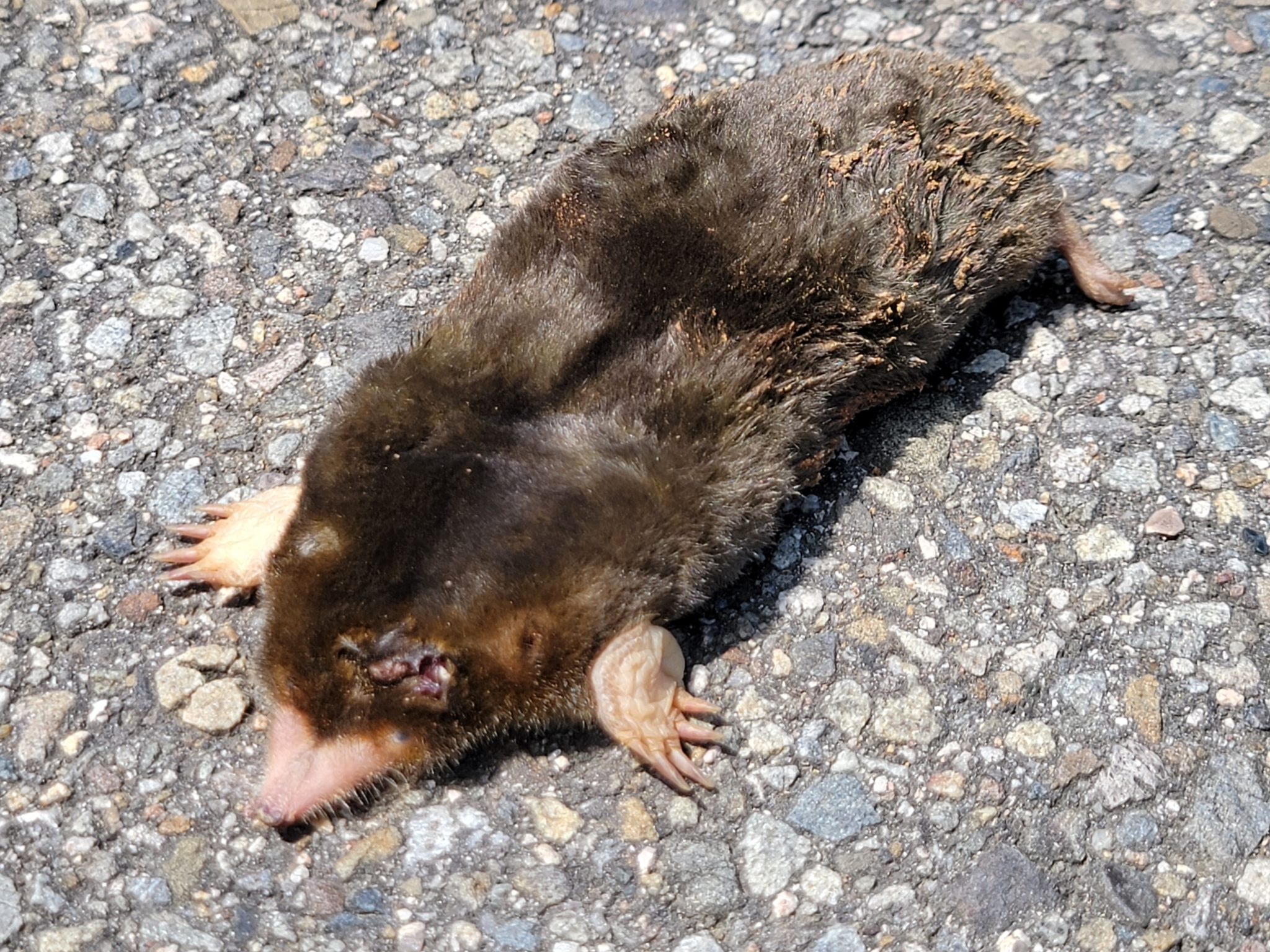

Conservation status
- Least Concern (IUCN 3.1)(includes latouchei and kanoana)

Scientific classification
- Kingdom: Animalia
- Phylum: Chordata
- Class: Mammalia
- Order: Eulipotyphla
- Family: Talpidae
- Genus: Mogera
- Species: M. insularis

Binomial name
- Mogera insularis R. Swinhoe, 1863
- Insular mole range (erroneously includes whole of Taiwan)

= Insular mole =

Species of mammal

The insular mole (Mogera insularis) is a species of mammal in the family Talpidae. It is restricted to Hainan Island and Taiwan, where it is also known as the Formosan blind mole. The species was first described by Robert Swinhoe in 1863.

== Taxonomy ==
La Touche's mole (M. latouchei) of mainland China and northern Vietnam was formerly considered conspecific with M. insularis until a 2007 taxonomic analysis found it to be a distinct species. In addition, the same study found that populations of M. insularis in the mountainous center and western lowlands of Taiwan represented a new, distinct species, Kano's mole (M. kanoana). The same study also treated the Hainan population as a distinct species (M. hainana) for the sake of comparing geographic variation, but did not do genetic analysis on it and thus later authorities have not followed through with hainana as a distinct species. However, a 2021 genetic analysis found hainana to likely represent a distinct species, leaving insularis as endemic to only Taiwan.

Phylogenetic evidence supports it being the sister species to a clade comprising kanoana and hainana (if the latter is considered a distinct species).

== Characteristics ==
Mogera insularis is unique from other moles in the Talpinae family in that it has 32 chromosomes instead of 34 to 38 chromosomes. Additionally, Mogera insularis members also have a metacentric chromosome pair that is much larger than its other chromosome markers.
