= Anti-Japanese sentiment =

Hatred or fear of Japanese people or culture

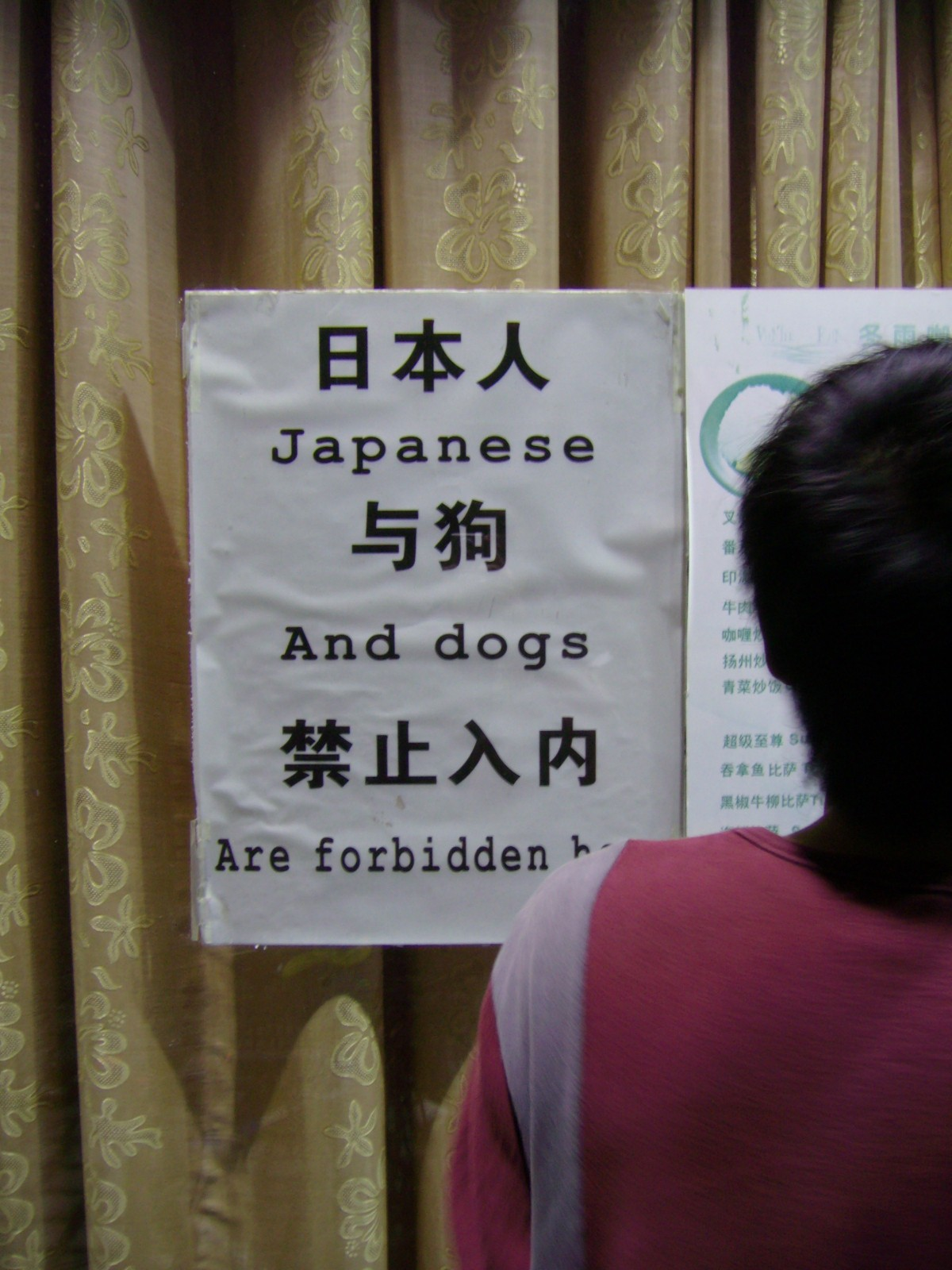
Poster outside of a restaurant in Guangzhou, China

Results of 2017 BBC World Service poll Views of Japan's influence by country (sorted by pos − neg)
Country polled	Positive	Negative	Neutral	Pos − neg
China	22%	75%	3	-53
Spain	39%	36%	25	3
Turkey	71%	24%	5	47
Pakistan	38%	20%	42	18
India	45%	17%	38	28
Russia	45%	16%	39	29
Peru	56%	25%	19	31
Nigeria	57%	24%	19	33
United Kingdom	65%	30%	5	35
Mexico	59%	23%	18	36
Kenya	58%	22%	20	36
Germany	50%	13%	37	37
Indonesia	57%	17%	26	40
United States	65%	23%	12	42
France	74%	21%	5	53
Brazil	70%	15%	15	55
Australia	78%	17%	5	61
Canada	77%	12%	11	65

Results of 2013 Pew Research Center poll Asia/Pacific views of Japan by country (sorted by fav − unfav)
Country polled	Favorable	Unfavorable	Neutral	Fav − Unfav
China	4%	90%	6	-86
South Korea	22%	77%	1	-55
Pakistan	51%	7%	42	44
Philippines	78%	18%	4	60
Australia	78%	16%	6	62
Indonesia	79%	12%	9	67
Malaysia	80%	6%	14	74

Results of 2011 BBC World Service poll Views of Japan's influence by country (sorted by pos − neg)
Country polled	Positive	Negative	Neutral	Pos − Neg
China	18%	71%	11	-53
Mexico	24%	34%	42	-10
Pakistan	34%	15%	51	19
South Africa	41%	17%	42	24
India	39%	13%	48	26
France	55%	29%	16	26
Portugal	43%	13%	44	30
United Kingdom	58%	26%	16	32
Germany	58%	25%	17	33
Ghana	55%	11%	34	34
Australia	60%	26%	14	34
Spain	57%	19%	24	38
Egypt	52%	14%	34	38
Kenya	61%	20%	19	41
Turkey	60%	32%	8	43
South Korea	68%	20%	12	48
Italy	66%	18%	16	48
Brazil	66%	16%	18	50
Nigeria	65%	14%	21	51
Canada	67%	16%	17	51
United States	69%	18%	13	51
Chile	66%	14%	20	52
Peru	64%	10%	26	54
Russia	65%	7%	28	58
Philippines	84%	12%	4	72
Indonesia	85%	7%	8	78

Anti-Japanese sentiment (also called Japanophobia, Nipponophobia and anti-Japanism) is the fear or dislike of Japan or Japanese culture. Anti-Japanese sentiment can take many forms, from antipathy toward Japan as a country to racist or xenophobic hatred of Japanese people.

== Overview ==
Anti-Japanese sentiments range from animosity towards the Japanese government's actions during the Second Sino-Japanese War and World War II, to disdain for Japanese culture, or to racism against the Japanese people. Sentiments of dehumanization have been fueled by the anti-Japanese propaganda of the Allied governments in World War II; this propaganda was often of a racially disparaging character. Anti-Japanese sentiment may be strongest in Korea and China, due to atrocities committed by the Imperial Japanese military.

In the past, anti-Japanese sentiment contained innuendos of Japanese people as barbaric. Following the Meiji Restoration of 1868, Japan was intent to adopt Western ways in an attempt to join the West as an industrialized imperial power, but a lack of acceptance of the Japanese in the West complicated integration and assimilation. Japanese culture was viewed with suspicion and even disdain.

While passions have settled somewhat since Imperial Japan's surrender in the Pacific War theater of World War II, tempers continue to flare on occasion over the widespread perception that the Japanese government has made insufficient penance for their past atrocities, or has sought to whitewash the history of these events. Today, though the Japanese government has effected some compensatory measures, anti-Japanese sentiment continues based on historical and nationalist animosities linked to Imperial Japanese military aggression and atrocities. Japan's delay in clearing more than 700,000 (according to the Japanese Government) pieces of life-threatening and environment contaminating chemical weapons buried in China at the end of World War II is another cause of anti-Japanese sentiment.

Periodically, individuals within Japan spur external criticism. Former Prime Minister Junichiro Koizumi was heavily criticized by South Korea and China for annually paying his respects to the war dead at Yasukuni Shrine, which enshrines all those who fought and died for Imperial Japan as part of the Axis powers during World War II, including 1,068 convicted war criminals. Right-wing nationalist groups have produced history textbooks whitewashing Japanese atrocities, and the recurring controversies over these books occasionally attract hostile foreign attention.

Some anti-Japanese sentiment originates from business practices used by some Japanese companies, such as dumping.

== By region ==
=== Brazil ===
Like the elites in Argentina and Uruguay, the Brazilian elite wanted to racially whiten the country's population during the 19th and 20th centuries. The country's governments always encouraged European immigration, but non-white immigration was always greeted with considerable opposition. The communities of Japanese immigrants were seen as an obstacle to the whitening of Brazil and they were also seen, among other concerns, as being particularly tendentious because they formed ghettos and they also practiced endogamy at a high rate. Oliveira Viana, a Brazilian jurist, historian, and sociologist, described the Japanese immigrants as follows: "They (Japanese) are like sulfur: insoluble." The Brazilian magazine O Malho in its edition of 5 December 1908, issued a charge of Japanese immigrants with the following legend: "The government of São Paulo is stubborn. After the failure of the first Japanese immigration, it contracted 3,000 yellow people. It insists on giving Brazil a race diametrically opposite to ours." On 22 October 1923, Representative Fidélis Reis produced a bill on the entry of immigrants, whose fifth article was as follows: "The entry of settlers from the black race into Brazil is prohibited. For Asian [immigrants] there will be allowed each year a number equal to 5% of those residing in the country...."

Years before World War II, the government of President Getúlio Vargas initiated a process of forced assimilation of people of immigrant origin in Brazil. In 1933, a constitutional amendment was approved by a large majority and established immigration quotas without mentioning race or nationality and prohibited the population concentration of immigrants. According to the text, Brazil could not receive more than 2% of the total number of entrants of each nationality that had been received in the last 50 years. Only the Portuguese were excluded. The measures did not affect the immigration of Europeans such as Italians and Spaniards, who had already entered in large numbers and whose migratory flow was downward. However, immigration quotas, which remained in force until the 1980s, restricted Japanese immigration, as well as Korean and Chinese immigration.

When Brazil sided with the Allies and declared war on Japan in 1942, all communication with Japan was cut off, the entry of new Japanese immigrants was forbidden, and many restrictions affected the Japanese Brazilians. Japanese newspapers and teaching the Japanese language in schools were banned, which left Portuguese as the only option for Japanese descendants. As many Japanese immigrants could not understand Portuguese, it became exceedingly difficult for them to obtain any extra-communal information. In 1939, research of Estrada de Ferro Noroeste do Brasil in São Paulo showed that 87.7% of Japanese Brazilians read newspapers in the Japanese language, a much higher literacy rate than the general populace at the time. Japanese Brazilians could not travel without safe conduct issued by the police, Japanese schools were closed, and radio receivers were confiscated to prevent transmissions on shortwave from Japan. The goods of Japanese companies were confiscated and several companies of Japanese origin had interventions by the government. Japanese Brazilians were prohibited from driving motor vehicles, and the drivers employed by the Japanese had to have permission from the police. Thousands of Japanese immigrants were arrested or deported from Brazil on suspicion of espionage. On 10 July 1943, approximately 10,000 Japanese and German and Italian immigrants who lived in Santos had 24 hours to move away from the Brazilian coast. The police acted without any notice. About 90% of the people displaced were Japanese. To reside in coastal areas, the Japanese had to have a safe conduct. In 1942, the Japanese community that introduced the cultivation of pepper in Tomé-Açu, in Pará, was virtually turned into a "concentration camp". This time, the Brazilian ambassador in Washington, DC, Carlos Martins Pereira e Sousa, encouraged the government of Brazil to transfer all Japanese Brazilians to "internment camps" without the need for legal support, just as was done with the Japanese residents in the United States. However, no suspicion of activities of the Japanese against "national security" was ever confirmed.

Even after the war ended, anti-Japanese sentiment persisted in Brazil. After the war, Shindo Renmei, a terrorist organization formed by Japanese immigrants that murdered Japanese-Brazilians who believed in Japanese surrender, was founded. The violent acts committed by this organization increased anti-Japanese sentiment in Brazil and caused several violent conflicts between Brazilians and Japanese-Brazilians. During the National Constituent Assembly of 1946, the representative of Rio de Janeiro Miguel Couto Filho proposed an amendment to the Constitution saying "It is prohibited the entry of Japanese immigrants of any age and any origin in the country." In the final vote, a tie with 99 votes in favour and 99 against. Senator Fernando de Melo Viana, who chaired the session of the Constituent Assembly, had the casting vote and rejected the constitutional amendment. By only one vote, the immigration of Japanese people to Brazil was not prohibited by the Brazilian Constitution of 1946.

In the second half of the 2010s, a certain anti-Japanese feeling has grown in Brazil. The former Brazilian president, Jair Bolsonaro, was accused of making statements considered discriminatory against Japanese people, which generated repercussions in the press and in the Japanese-Brazilian community, which is considered the largest in the world outside of Japan. In addition, in 2020, possibly as a result of the COVID-19 pandemic, some incidents of xenophobia and abuse were reported to Japanese-Brazilians in cities such as São Paulo and Rio de Janeiro.

According to a 2017 BBC World Service survey, 70% of Brazilians view Japan's influence positively, with 15% expressing a negative view, making Brazil one of the most pro-Japanese countries in South America.

=== Canada ===
Like other countries to which the Japanese immigrated in significant numbers, anti-Japanese sentiment in Canada was strongest during the 20th century, with the formation of anti-immigration organizations such as the Asiatic Exclusion League in response to Japanese and other Asian immigration. Anti-Japanese and anti-Chinese riots also frequently broke out such one in early 1900s Vancouver. During World War II, Japanese Canadians were interned like their American counterparts. Financial compensation for surviving internees was finally paid in 1988 by the Brian Mulroney government.

=== China ===
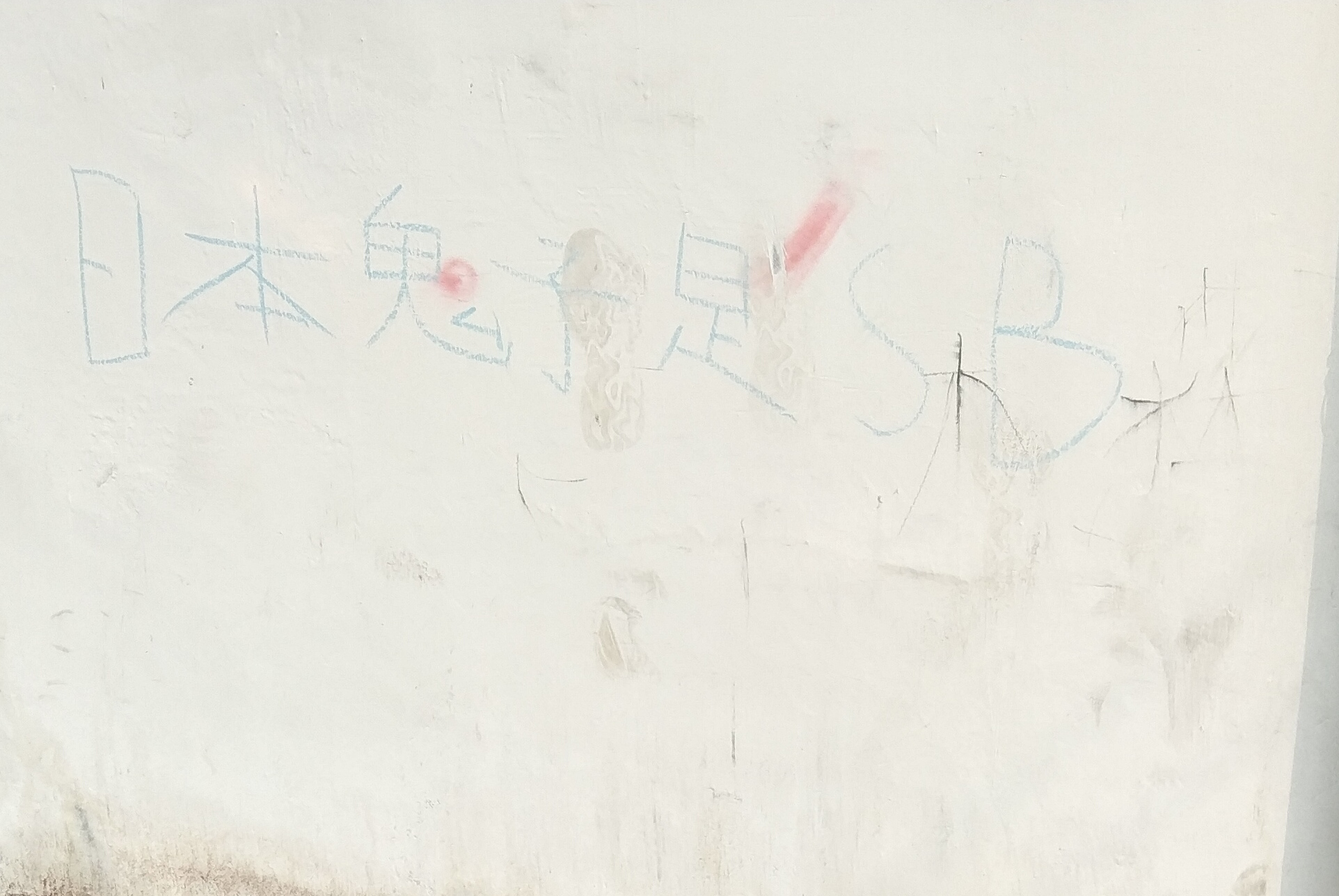
Anti-Japanese slogan on a wall in Luoyang: "Japanese guizi are pieces of shit"

Anti-Japanese sentiment is felt very strongly in China, and distrust, hostility and negative feelings towards Japan and the Japanese people and culture is widespread in China. Anti-Japanese sentiment is a phenomenon that mostly dates back to modern times (since 1868). Like many Western powers during the era of imperialism, Imperial Japan negotiated treaties that often resulted in the annexation of land from China towards the end of the Qing dynasty. Dissatisfaction with Japanese settlements and the Twenty-One Demands by the Japanese government led to a boycott of Japanese products in China.

Today, bitterness persists in China over the atrocities of the Second Sino-Japanese War and Japan's postwar actions, particularly the perceived lack of a straightforward acknowledgment of such atrocities, the Japanese government's employment of known war criminals, and Japanese historic revisionism in textbooks. In elementary school, children are taught about Japanese war crimes in detail. For example, thousands of children are brought to the Museum of the War of Chinese People's Resistance Against Japanese Aggression in Beijing by their elementary schools and are required to view photos of war atrocities, such as exhibits of records of the Japanese military forcing Chinese workers into wartime labor, the Nanjing Massacre, and the issues of comfort women. Despite the time that has passed since the war's end, discussions about Japanese conduct during the war can still evoke powerful emotions today, partly because most Japanese are aware of what happened during it, and their society never engaged in the type of introspection which has been common in Germany after the Holocaust. The usage of Japanese military symbols is still controversial in China, such as an incident in which the Chinese pop singer Zhao Wei was seen wearing a Rising Sun Flag while she was dressed for a fashion magazine photo shoot in 2001. This elicited many reactions on the Internet, and an open letter demanding a public apology was circulated by a Nanjing massacre survivor. According to a 2017 BBC World Service Poll, only 22% of Chinese people view Japan's influence positively, and 75% express a negative view, making China the most anti-Japanese nation in the world. Online hate speech against the Japanese is common on Chinese social media.

Anti-Japanese sentiment can also be seen in war films and anime that are produced and broadcast in Mainland China. More than 200 anti-Japanese films were produced in China in 2012 alone. In one particular situation involving a more moderate anti-Japanese war film, the government of China banned the 2000 fictional film, Devils on the Doorstep, because it depicted a Japanese soldier being friendly with Chinese villagers.

=== France ===
Japan's public service broadcaster, NHK, provides a list of overseas safety risks for traveling, and in early 2020, it listed anti-Japanese discrimination as a safety risk on travel to France and some other European countries, possibly because of fears over the COVID-19 pandemic and other factors. Signs of rising anti-Japanese sentiment in France include an increase in anti-Japanese incidents reported by Japanese nationals, such as being mocked on the street and refused taxi service, and least one Japanese restaurant has been vandalized. A group of Japanese students on a study tour in Paris received abuse by locals. Another group of Japanese citizens was targeted by acid attacks, which prompted the Japanese embassy as well as the foreign ministry to issue a warning to Japanese nationals in France, urging caution. Due to rising discrimination, a Japanese TV announcer in Paris said it's best not to speak Japanese in public or wear a Japanese costume like a kimono.

=== Germany ===
According to the Japanese foreign ministry, anti-Japanese sentiment and discrimination has been rising in Germany, especially recently when the COVID-19 pandemic began affecting the country.

Media sources have reported a rise in anti-Japanese sentiment in Germany, with some Japanese residents saying suspicion and contempt towards them have increased noticeably. In line with those sentiments, there have been a rising number of anti-Japanese incidents such as at least one major football club kicking out all Japanese fans from their stadium over fears of the coronavirus, locals throwing raw eggs at Japanese people's homes and a general increase in the level of harassment toward Japanese residents.

=== Indonesia ===
In a press release, the embassy of Japan in Indonesia stated that incidents of discrimination and harassment of Japanese people had increased, and they were possibly partly related to the COVID-19 pandemic in 2020, and it also announced that it had set up a help center in order to assist Japanese residents in dealing with those incidents. In general, there have been reports of widespread anti-Japanese discrimination and harassment in the country, with hotels, stores, restaurants, taxi services and more refusing Japanese customers and many Japanese people were no longer allowed in meetings and conferences. The embassy of Japan has also received at least a dozen reports of harassment toward Japanese people in just a few days. According to the Ministry of Foreign Affairs (Japan), anti-Japanese sentiment and discrimination has been rising in Indonesia.

=== Korea ===
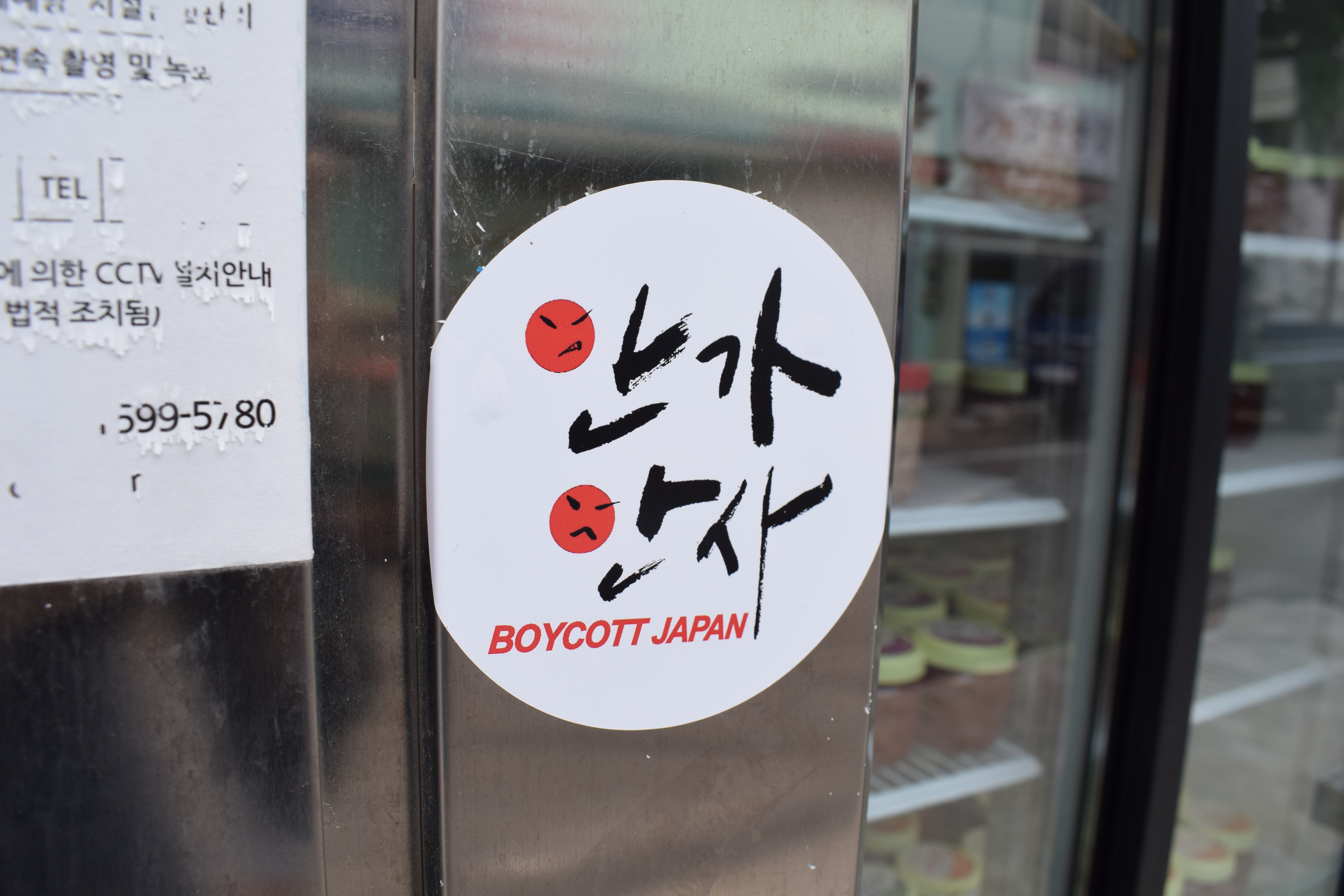
"Boycott Japan" sticker on shop in Mokpo

The issue of anti-Japanese sentiment in Korea is complex and multifaceted. Anti-Japanese attitudes in the Korean Peninsula can be traced as far back as the Japanese pirate raids and the Japanese invasions of Korea (1592–1598), but they are largely a product of the Japanese occupation of Korea which lasted from 1910 to 1945 and the subsequent revisionism of history textbooks which have been used by Japan's educational system since World War II.

Today, issues of Japanese history textbook controversies, Japanese policy regarding the war, and geographic disputes between the two countries perpetuate that sentiment, and the issues often incur huge disputes between Japanese and South Korean Internet users. South Korea, together with Mainland China, may be considered as among the most intensely anti-Japanese societies in the world. Among all the countries that participated in BBC World Service Poll in 2007 and 2009, South Korea and the People's Republic of China were the only ones whose majorities rated Japan negatively.

Anti-Japanese sentiment in Korea has decreased in the 2020s; according to a poll in conducted in late 2025 by the Japanese Public Interest Incorporated Newspaper and the Communications Research Association, 56.4% of South Koreans had a favorable view of Japan, with favorability especially high in those in their 20s and 30s.

=== Peru ===
Anti-Japanese sentiment in Peru started during the 20th century as part of a general anti-Asiatic sentiment (amid Chinese immigration to Perú then) in which Japanese and Chinese people were catalogued as a "yellow menace" that deteriorated the Peruvian race and invaded Peruvian territory. Politicians and intellectuals tried to generate repudiation against Asians through publications such as bulletins and articles in newspapers and pamphlets that ridiculed them, even inciting the Peruvian people to attack Japanese-Peruvian citizens and their businesses. Peruvian worker protests led to the creation of an Anti-Asian Association in 1917 and the abolition of contract migration in 1923.

The pre-war times were especially difficult for Japanese immigrants, as anti-Japanese sentiment came to influence the Peruvian government itself (with the deportations of Japanese to concentration camps in the United States during World War II, specially to its only family internment camp in Crystal City, Texas). Although there had been ongoing tensions between non-Japanese and Japanese Peruvians, the situation was drastically exacerbated by the war. The economic success of Japanese farmers and businessmen in niche but visible sectors, the significant amount of remittances sent back to Japan, the fear that Japanese were taking jobs from the locals and a growing trade imbalance between Japan and Peru were motives to implement legislation in order to curb Japanese immigration through its borders. Like in 1937, when the Peruvian government passed a decree revoking citizenship rights of Peruvians who had Japanese ancestry, a second decree followed, making it even more difficult to maintain citizenship, the results of which included stigmatization of Japanese immigrants as "bestial", "untrustworthy", "militaristic", and "unfairly" competing with Peruvians for wages. These contributed to increasing nationalism and anti-Japanese sentiment which worsened alongside the depressed and unstable Peruvian economy.

Fueled by legislative discrimination and media campaigns, a massive race riot (referred to as the "Saqueo") began on May 13, 1940, and lasted for three days. During the riots, Japanese-Peruvians were attacked and their homes and businesses destroyed. Over 600 Japanese residences and businesses were damaged in Lima, resulting in dozens of injuries and one Japanese death. Not only was it the "worst rioting in Peruvian history," but it was also the first to target a racial group (because Peruvians mostly discriminate by social class, but didn't have a tradition of discrimination by race). Despite its massive scale, the Saqueo was underreported, a reflection of public sentiment towards the Japanese population at the time.

The Japanese-Peruvian deportees were viewed as a threat to both Peru and the United States before and after the bombing of Pearl Harbor on December 7, 1941. Peru registered pressure from the United States, which influenced Peruvians' "anti-Japanese attitude" against their own citizens. The deportation of Japanese-Peruvians to the United States also involved expropriation without compensation of their property and other assets in Peru. As noted in a 1943 memorandum, Raymond Ickes of the Central and South American division of the Alien Enemy Control Unit had observed that many ethnic Japanese had been sent to the United States "... merely because the Peruvians wanted their businesses and not because there was any adverse evidence against them."

After the war, anti-Japanese sentiment in Peruvian society decreased, especially after 1960 (when Japan started to develop closer relations with Peru and the local Nikkei community). However, there was a revival of those sentiments after then-President of Peru Alberto Fujimori (a Peruvian and Japanese citizen of Japanese descent) was involved in a corruption scandal, which generated antipathy against Japan in Peruvian circles, exacerbated by Japan's refusal to extradite him to Peru after he fled to Japan. This revival of anti-Japanese sentiment was so intense that the Japanese government expressed concern. After Alberto Fujimori's arrest and trial, the Japanese embassy in Peru and the local media received frequent telephone calls threatening to harm Japanese-Peruvians, Japanese businesses in Peru and installations of the Japanese embassy and its staff.

=== Philippines ===
A propaganda newspaper clipping which refers to the Bataan Death March in 1942 was distributed and sparked outrage worldwide.

Anti-Japanese sentiment in the Philippines can be traced back to the Japanese occupation of the country during World War II and its aftermath. An estimated 1 million Filipinos out of a wartime population of 17 million were killed during the war, and many more Filipinos were injured. Nearly every Filipino family was affected by the war on some level. Most notably, in the city of Mapanique, survivors have recounted the Japanese occupation during which Filipino men were massacred and dozens of women were herded in order to be used as comfort women. Today, the Philippines has peaceful relations with Japan. In addition, Filipinos are generally not as offended as Chinese or Koreans are by the claim from some quarters that the atrocities are given little, if any, attention in Japanese classrooms. This feeling exists as a result of the huge amount of Japanese aid which was sent to the country during the 1960s and 1970s.

The Davao Region, in Mindanao, had a large community of Japanese immigrants which acted as a fifth column by welcoming the Japanese invaders during the war. The Japanese were hated by the Moro Muslims and the Chinese. The Moro juramentadoss performed suicide attacks against the Japanese, and no Moro juramentado ever attacked the Chinese, who were not considered enemies of the Moro, unlike the Japanese.

According to a 2011 BBC World Service Poll, 84% of Filipinos view Japan's influence positively, with 12% expressing a negative view, making Philippines one of the most pro-Japanese countries in the world.

=== Singapore ===
The older generation of Singaporeans harbor some resentment towards Japan due to their experiences during World War II when Singapore was under Japanese occupation. However, due to good economic ties with Japan, Singapore currently maintains a positive relationship with them.

=== Taiwan ===
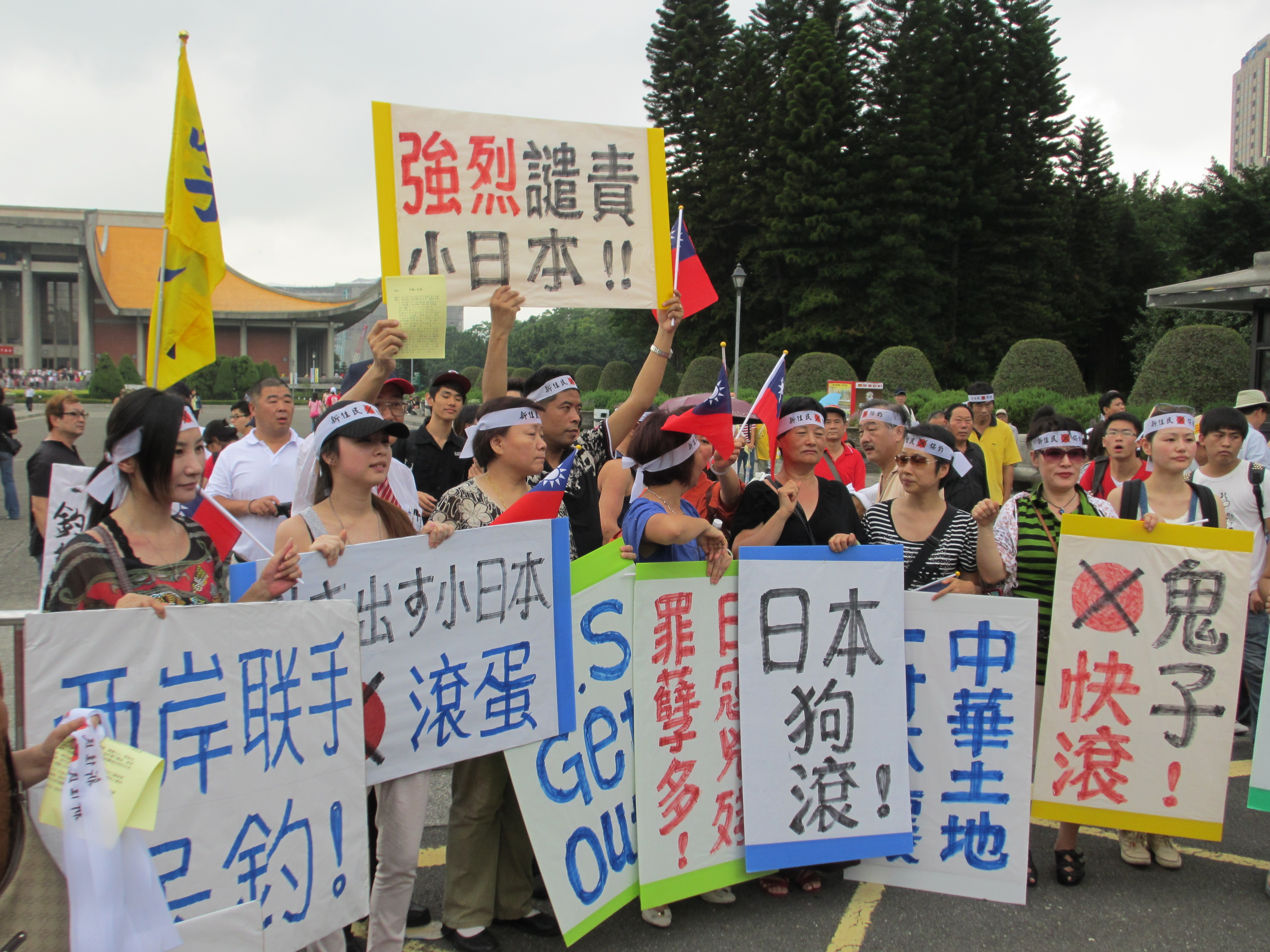
Demonstrators in Taipei, Taiwan, host signs telling "Japanese devils" to "get out" of the Senkaku Islands after an escalation of disputes.

Due to Japan's various oppression and enslavement of Taiwan during World War II and the dispute over the Senkaku Islands, anti-Japanese sentiment in Taiwan is very common, and most Taiwanese people have a negative impression of Japan. However, according to other surveys, Taiwan's anti-Japanese sentiment is seen as much weaker or relatively favorable compared to South Korea, which was affected by the same Japanese colonialism. Anti-Japanese sentiment appears weaker in Taiwan than anti-Chinese (especially anti-PRC) sentiment.

Unlike Korea, Taiwan did not form a strong unified national identity before the onset of Japanese rule in 1895. As a result, the colonial experience produced a more ambivalent set of public memories. Japan's administration introduced modern infrastructure, public health initiatives, and bureaucratic institutions, many of which were maintained after 1945, contributing to a more pragmatic evaluation of the colonial period among segments of the Taiwanese population.

After 1949, the Republic of China (ROC) government retreated to Taiwan and promoted a Chinese nationalist ideology focused primarily on anti-communism rather than anti-Japanese resistance. Although postwar generations were educated within this ideological framework, it resonated only partially with Taiwan's own colonial experience. Scholars note that the ROC's nation-building narrative did not directly address issues related to postcolonial identity, and the suppression of left-wing intellectuals during the 1950s further limited the emergence of alternative critical discourses on Japanese rule.

During the Cold War period, anti-Japanese nationalism propagated by the ROC coexisted with extensive practical reliance on Japan for trade, technology, and investment. Following democratization in the 1990s, Taiwan's public discourse increasingly emphasized local identity, leading to an expansion of historical narratives that incorporated the Japanese colonial period as one component of a pluralistic Taiwanese past, rather than viewing it solely through the lens of national trauma.

Since democratization in the 1990s, public discourse in Taiwan has increasingly emphasized local identity and has incorporated the Japanese colonial period into a pluralistic understanding of Taiwanese history rather than a singular trauma narrative. Public opinion surveys in recent years also suggest generally favorable attitudes toward Japan. A 2024–2025 poll commissioned by the Japan–Taiwan Exchange Association and conducted by the Taiwanese research firm P‐Pearson Data found that 81% of respondents reported feeling "close" or "very close" to Japan, and 76% identified Japan as their most favored country or region. The survey also recorded increases in perceived trust toward Japan and positive evaluations of current Japan–Taiwan relations compared with the association's previous 2022 poll.

The Kuomintang (KMT) victory in 2008 was followed by a boating accident resulting in Taiwanese deaths, which caused recent tensions. Taiwanese officials began speaking out on the historical territory disputes regarding the Diaoyutai/Senkaku Islands, which resulted in an increase in at least perceived anti-Japanese sentiment.

=== Thailand ===
Anti-Japanese sentiment was widespread among Thai pro-democracy student protesters in the 1970s. Demonstrators viewed the entry of Japanese companies into the country, invited by the Thai military, as an economic invasion.

=== Russian Empire and Soviet Union ===
In the Russian Empire, the Imperial Japanese victory during the Russo-Japanese War in 1905 halted Russia's ambitions in the East and led to a loss of prestige. During the later Russian Civil War, Japan was part of the Allied interventionist forces that helped to occupy Vladivostok until October 1922 with a puppet government under Grigorii Semenov. At the end of World War II during the Soviet-Japanese War in August 1945, the Red Army accepted the surrender of nearly 600,000 Japanese POWs after Emperor Hirohito announced the Japanese surrender on 15 August; 473,000 of them were repatriated, 55,000 of them had died in Soviet captivity, and the fate of the others is unknown. Presumably, many of them were deported to China or North Korea and forced to serve as laborers and soldiers. The Kuril Islands dispute is a source of contemporary anti-Japanese sentiment in Russia.

=== United Kingdom ===
In the 1902, the United Kingdom signed a formal military alliance with Japan. However, the alliance was especially discontinued in 1923, and by the 1930s, bilateral ties became strained when Britain opposed Japan's military expansion. During World War II, British anti-Japanese propaganda, much like its American counterpart, featured content that grotesquely exaggerated physical features of Japanese people, if not outright depicting them as animals such as spiders. Post-war, much anti-Japanese sentiment in Britain was focused on the treatment of British POWs (See The Bridge on the River Kwai).

=== United States ===
==== Pre-20th century ====
In the United States, anti-Japanese sentiment had its beginnings long before World War II. As early as the late 19th century, Asian immigrants were subjected to racial prejudice in the United States. Laws were passed which openly discriminated against Asians and sometimes, they particularly discriminated against Japanese. Many of these laws stated that Asians could not become US citizens and they also stated that Asians could not be granted basic rights such as the right to own land. These laws were greatly detrimental to the newly arrived immigrants because they denied them the right to own land and forced many of them who were farmers to become migrant workers. Some cite the formation of the Asiatic Exclusion League as the start of the anti-Japanese movement in California.

==== Early 20th century ====
Young China Club warning to American visitors against buying Japanese goods in San Francisco's Chinatown c. 1940

Anti-Japanese racism and the belief in the Yellow Peril in California intensified after the Japanese victory over the Russian Empire during the Russo-Japanese War. On 11 October 1906, the San Francisco, California Board of Education passed a regulation in which children of Japanese descent would be required to attend racially-segregated separate schools. Japanese immigrants then made up approximately 1% of the population of California, and many of them had come under the treaty in 1894 which had assured free immigration from Japan.

The Japanese invasion of Manchuria, China, in 1931 and was roundly criticized in the US. In addition, efforts by citizens outraged at Japanese atrocities, such as the Nanking Massacre, led to calls for American economic intervention to encourage Japan to leave China. The calls played a role in shaping American foreign policy. As more and more unfavorable reports of Japanese actions came to the attention of the American government, embargoes on oil and other supplies were placed on Japan out of concern for the Chinese people and for the American interests in the Pacific. Furthermore, European-Americans became very pro-China and anti-Japan, an example being a grassroots campaign for women to stop buying silk stockings because the material was procured from Japan through its colonies.

When the Second Sino-Japanese War broke out in 1937, Western public opinion was decidedly pro-China, with eyewitness reports by Western journalists on atrocities committed against Chinese civilians further strengthening anti-Japanese sentiments. African-American sentiments could be quite different than the mainstream and included organizations like the Pacific Movement of the Eastern World (PMEW), which promised equality and land distribution under Japanese rule. The PMEW had thousands of members hopefully preparing for liberation from white supremacy with the arrival of the Japanese Imperial Army.

==== World War II ====
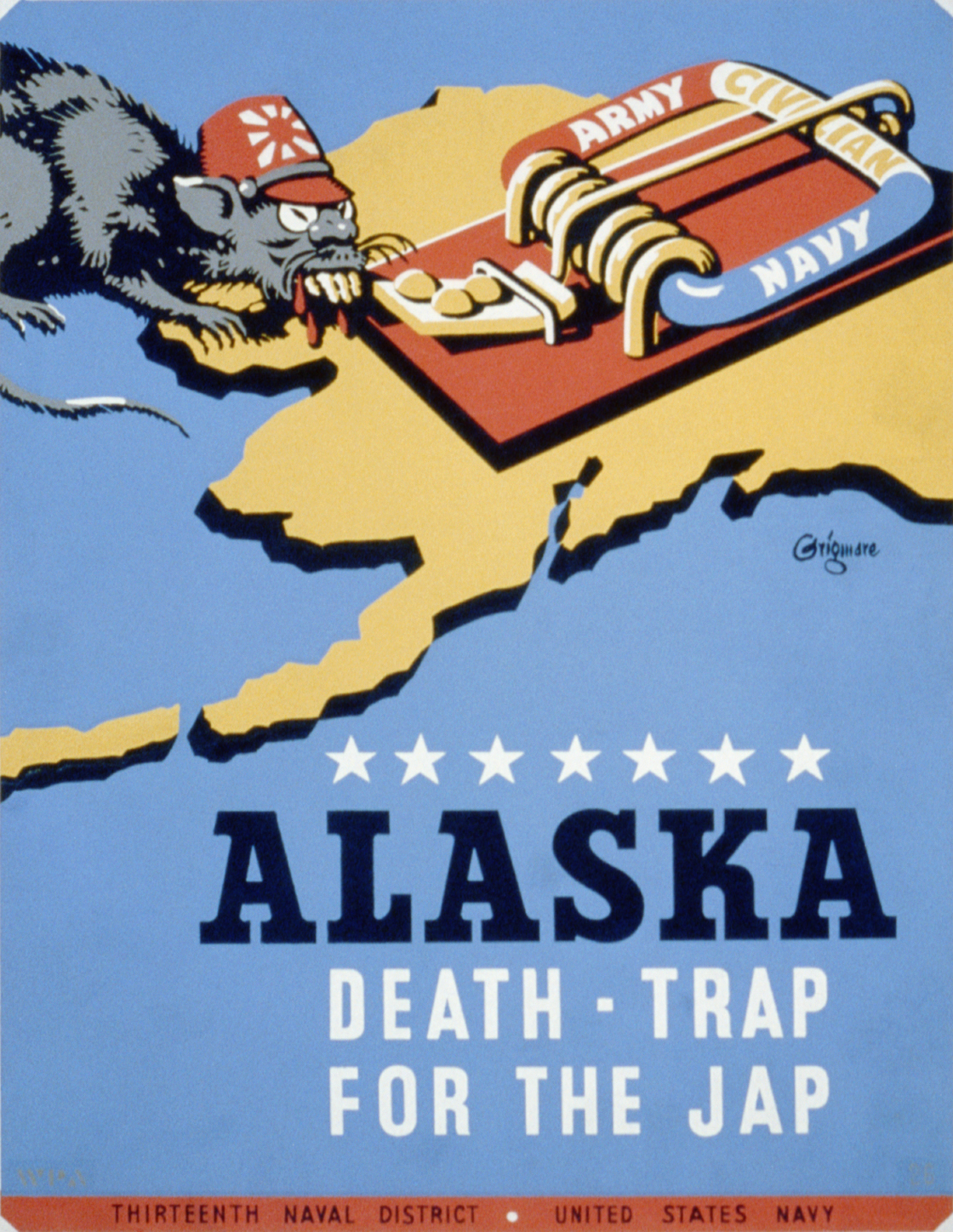
An American propaganda poster – "Death-trap for the Jap".

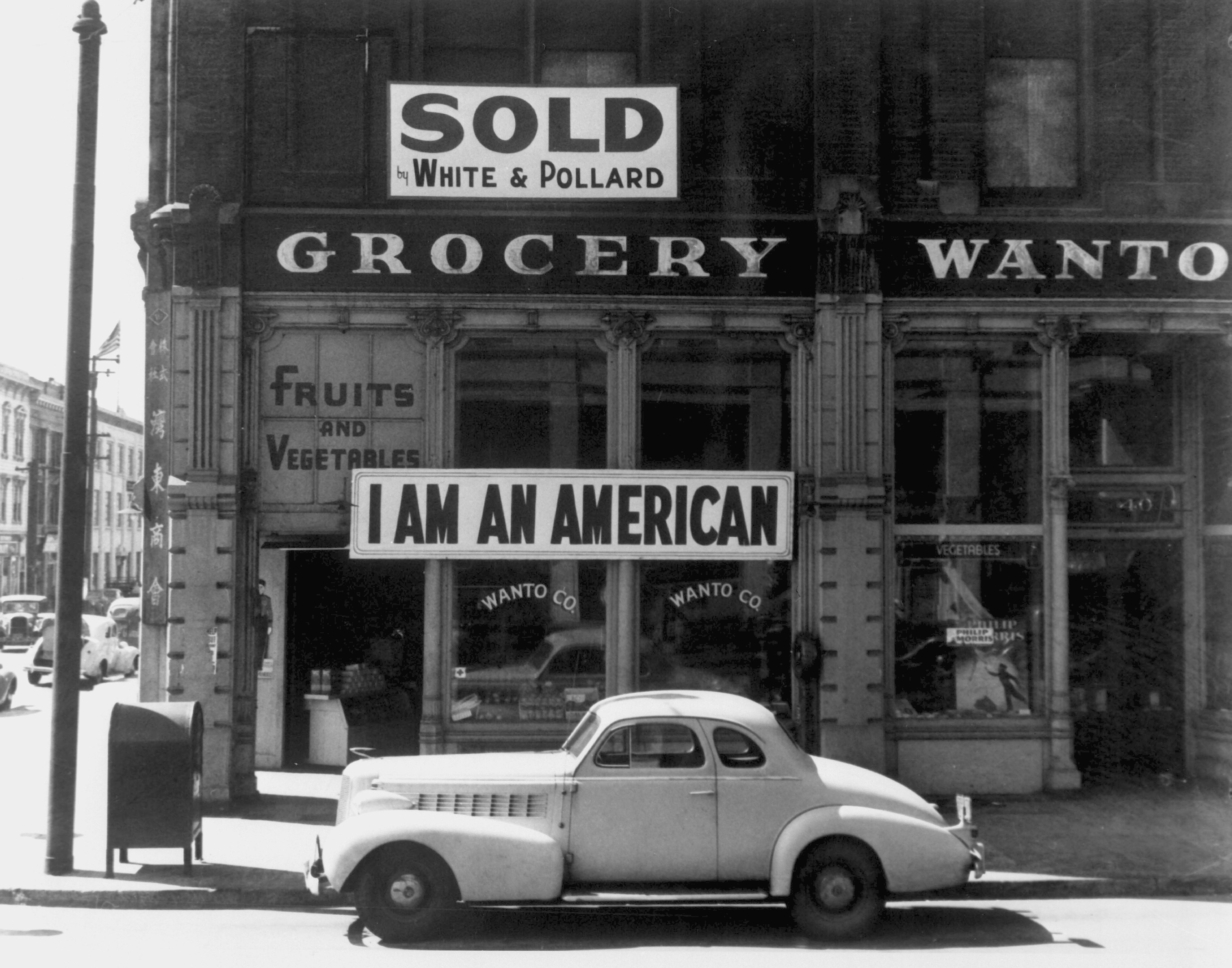
A Japanese-American unfurled this banner the day after the Pearl Harbor attack, but he was later detained. This Dorothea Lange photograph was taken in March 1942, just prior to the internment of Japanese Americans.

The most profound cause of anti-Japanese sentiment outside of Asia started by the Japanese attack on Pearl Harbor, which propelled the United States into World War II. The Americans were unified by the attack to fight the Empire of Japan and its allies: the German Reich and the Kingdom of Italy.

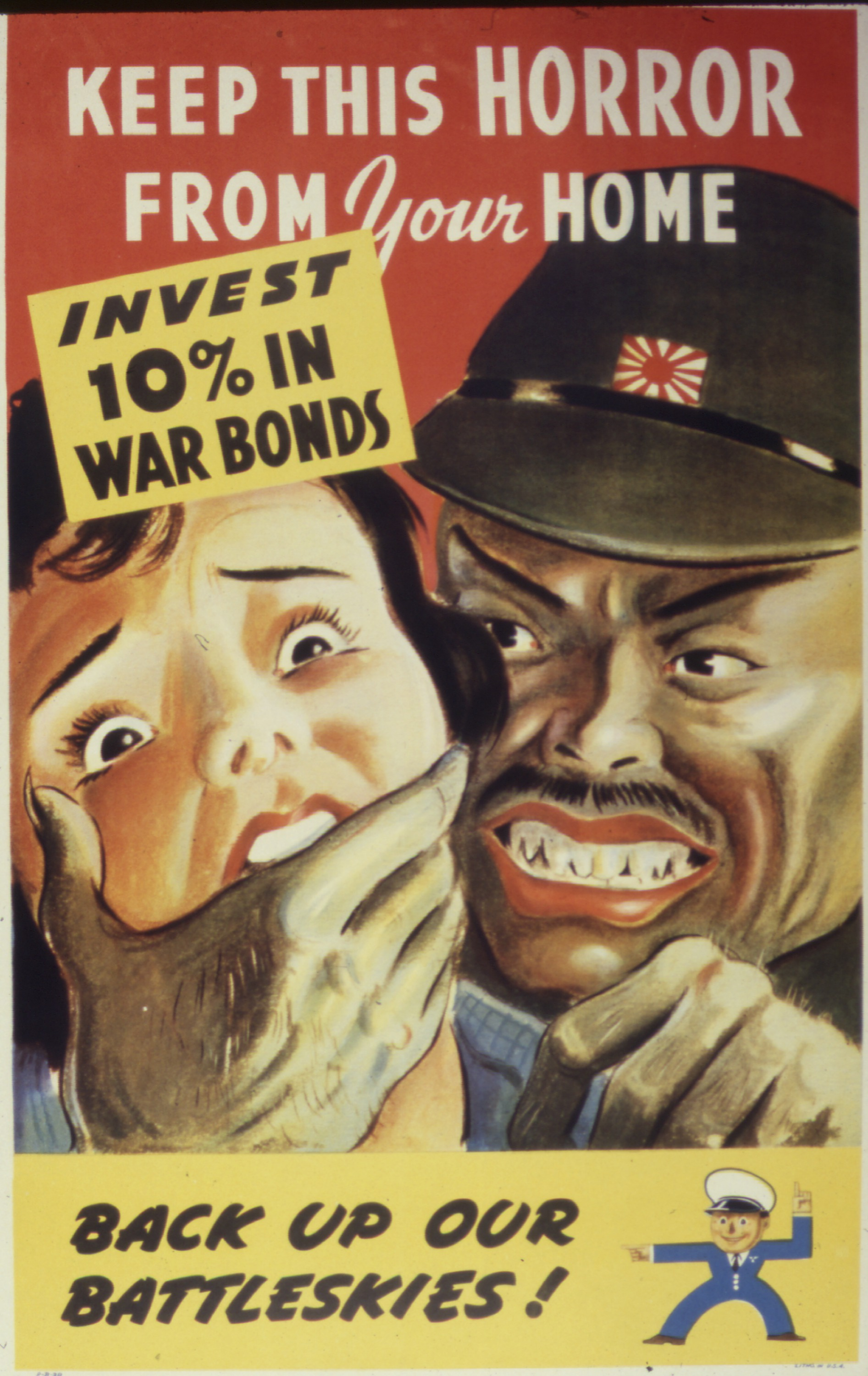
U.S. propaganda showed the Japanese as a threat to civilians such as women.

The surprise attack on Pearl Harbor without a declaration of war was commonly regarded as an act of treachery and cowardice. After the attack, many non-governmental "Jap hunting licenses" were circulated around the country. Life magazine published an article on how to tell the difference between Japanese and Chinese by describing the shapes of their noses and the statures of their bodies. Additionally, Japanese conduct during the war did little to quell anti-Japanese sentiment. The flames of outrage were fanned by the treatment of American and other prisoners-of-war (POWs). The Japanese military's outrages included the murder of POWs, the use of POWs as slave laborers by Japanese industries, the Bataan Death March, the kamikaze attacks on Allied ships, the atrocities which were committed on Wake Island, and other atrocities which were committed elsewhere.

The US historian James J. Weingartner attributes the very low number of Japanese in US POW compounds to two key factors: a Japanese reluctance to surrender and a widespread American "conviction that the Japanese were 'animals' or 'subhuman' and unworthy of the normal treatment accorded to POWs." The latter reasoning is supported by Niall Ferguson: "Allied troops often saw the Japanese in the same way that Germans regarded Russians [sic] — as Untermenschen." Weingartner believed that to explain why merely 604 Japanese captives were alive in Allied POW camps by October 1944.

Ulrich Straus, a US Japanologist, wrote that frontline troops intensely hated Japanese military personnel and were "not easily persuaded" to take or protect prisoners, as they believed that Allied personnel who surrendered got "no mercy" from the Japanese.

Allied soldiers believed that Japanese soldiers were inclined to feign surrender in order to launch surprise attacks. Therefore, according to Straus, "[s]enior officers opposed the taking of prisoners[,] on the grounds that it needlessly exposed American troops to risks...."

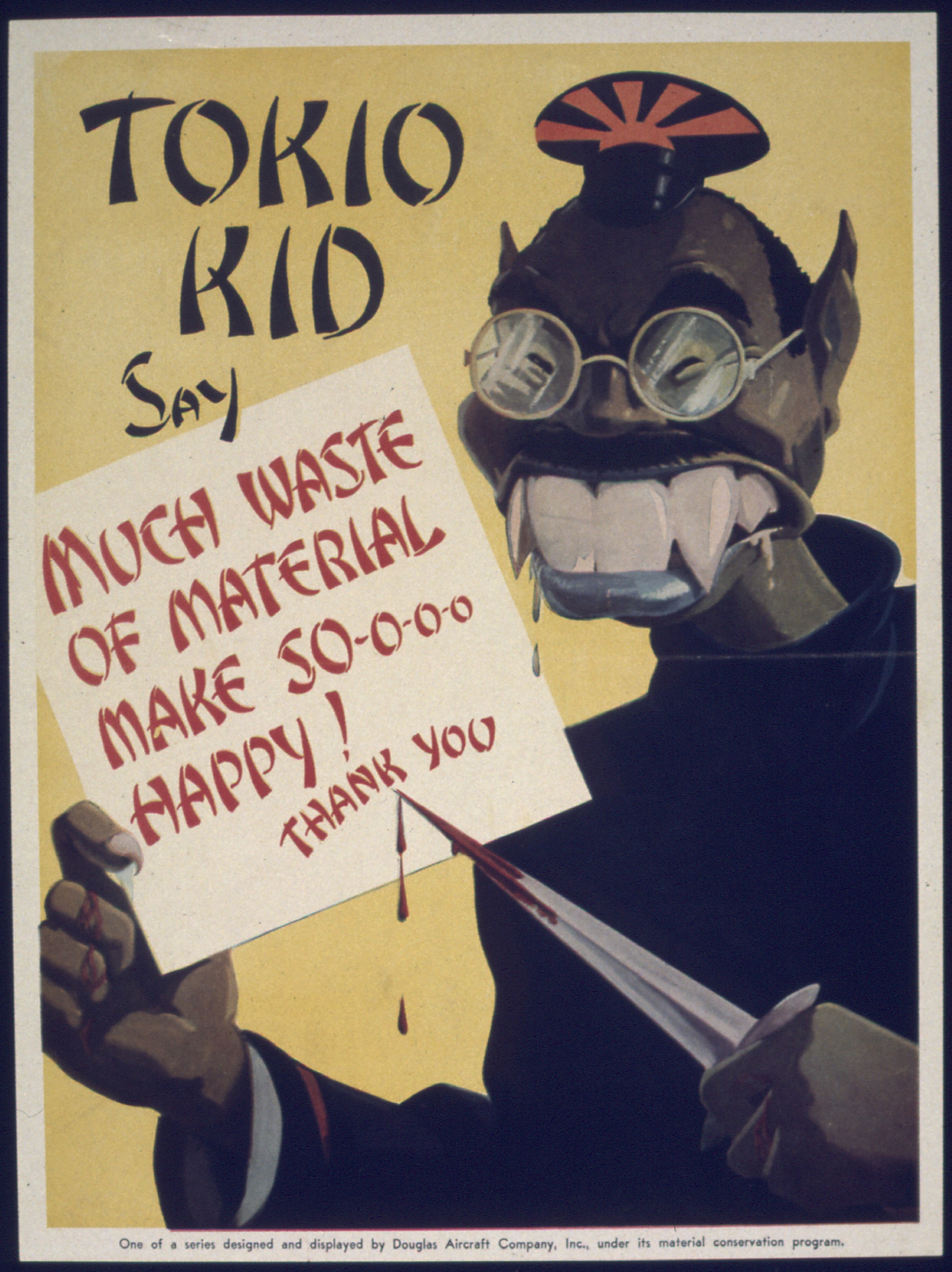
United States World War II poster. Shows a grossly exaggerated caricature of a demonic monster figure, possibly based on Hideki Tōjō. The figure holds a knife dripping blood and a sign in Japlish.

An estimated 112,000 to 120,000 Japanese migrants and Japanese Americans from the West Coast were interned regardless of their attitude to the US or to Japan. They were held for the duration of the war in the Continental US. Only a few members of the large Japanese population of Hawaii were relocated in spite of the proximity to vital military areas.

A 1944 opinion poll found that 13% of the US public supported the genocide of all Japanese. Daniel Goldhagen wrote in his book, "So it is no surprise that Americans perpetrated and supported mass slaughters - Tokyo's firebombing and then nuclear incinerations - in the name of saving American lives, and of giving the Japanese what they richly deserved."

===== Decision to drop the atomic bombs =====
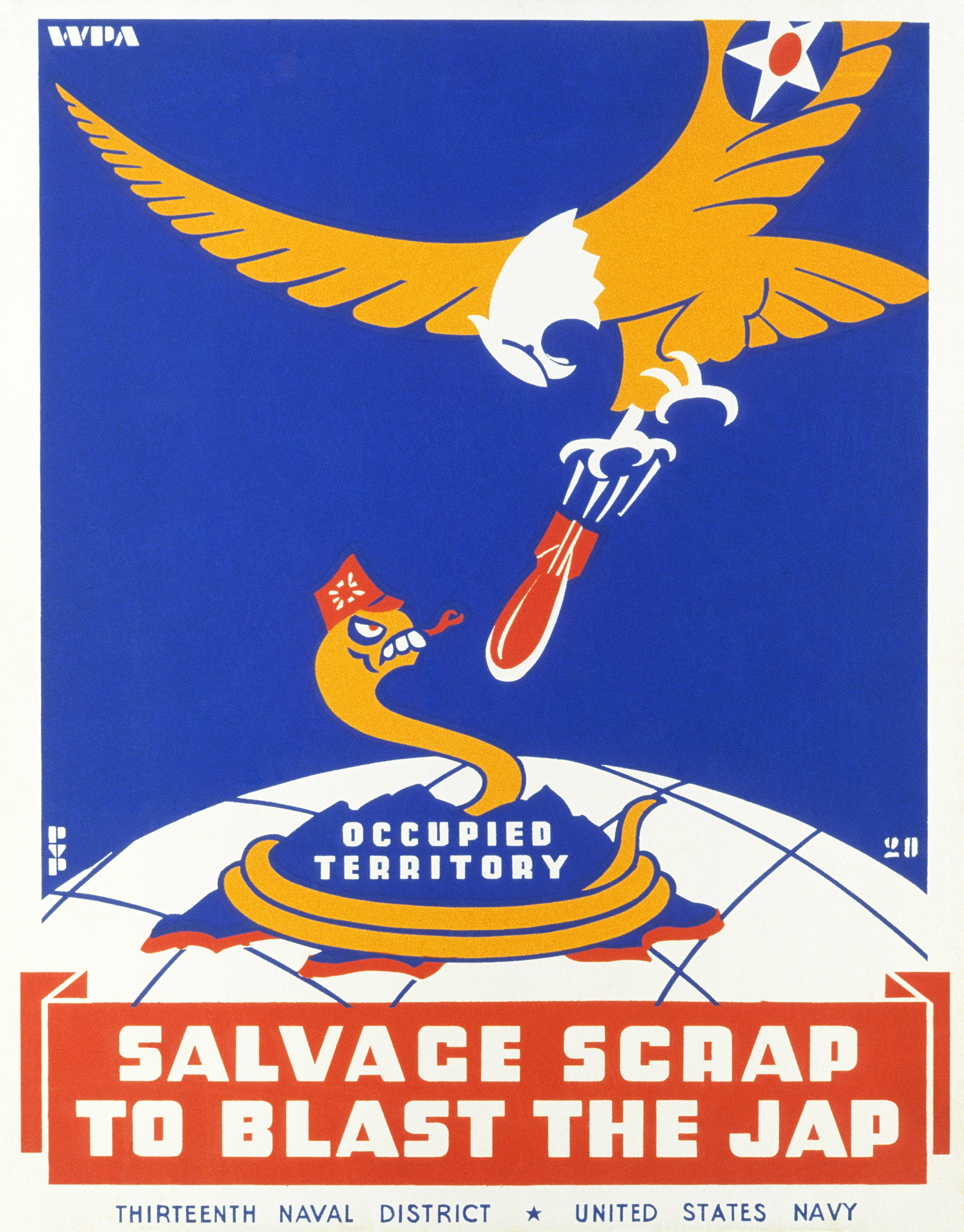
An American propaganda poster – "Salvage scrap to blast the Jap".

Weingartner argued that there was a common cause between the mutilation of Japanese war dead and the decision to bomb Hiroshima and Nagasaki. According to Weingartner, both of these decisions were partially the result of the dehumanization of the enemy: "The widespread image of the Japanese as sub-human constituted an emotional context which provided another justification for decisions which resulted in the death of hundreds of thousands." Two days after the Nagasaki bomb, US President Harry Truman stated: "The only language they seem to understand is the one we have been using to bombard them. When you have to deal with a beast you have to treat him like a beast. It is most regrettable but nevertheless true."

==== Postwar ====
In the 1970s and the 1980s, the waning fortunes of heavy industry in the United States prompted layoffs and hiring slowdowns just as counterpart businesses in Japan were making major inroads into US markets. That was most visible than in the automobile industry whose lethargic Big Three (General Motors, Ford, and Chrysler) watched as their former customers bought Japanese imports from Honda, Subaru, Mazda, and Nissan because of the 1973 oil crisis and the 1979 energy crisis. (When Japanese automakers were establishing their inroads into the US and Canada. Isuzu, Mazda, and Mitsubishi had joint partnerships with a Big Three manufacturer (GM, Ford, and Chrysler) in which its products were sold as captives). Anti-Japanese sentiment was reflected in opinion polling at the time as well as in media portrayals.

Extreme manifestations of anti-Japanese sentiment were occasional public destruction of Japanese cars and in the 1982 murder of Vincent Chin, a Chinese-American who was beaten to death after he had been mistaken for being Japanese.

Anti-Japanese sentiments were intentionally incited by US politicians as part of partisan politics designed to attack the Reagan presidency.

Other highly-symbolic deals, including the sale of famous American commercial and cultural symbols such as Columbia Records, Columbia Pictures, 7-Eleven, and the Rockefeller Center building to Japanese firms, further fanned anti-Japanese sentiment.

Popular culture of the period reflected American's growing distrust of Japan. Futuristic period pieces such as Back to the Future Part II and RoboCop 3 frequently showed Americans as working precariously under Japanese superiors. The film Blade Runner showed a futuristic Los Angeles clearly under Japanese domination, with a Japanese majority population and culture, perhaps a reference to the alternate world presented in the novel The Man in the High Castle by Philip K. Dick, the same author on which the film was based in which Japan had won World War II. Criticism was also lobbied in many novels of the day. The author Michael Crichton wrote Rising Sun, a murder mystery (later made into a feature film) involving Japanese businessmen in the US. Likewise, in Tom Clancy's book, Debt of Honor, Clancy implies that Japan's prosperity was caused primarily to unequal trading terms and portrayed Japan's business leaders acting in a power-hungry cabal.

As argued by Marie Thorsten, however, Japanophobia was mixed with Japanophilia during Japan's peak moments of economic dominance in the 1980s. The fear of Japan became a rallying point for techno-nationalism, the imperative to be first in the world in mathematics, science, and other quantifiable measures of national strength necessary to boost technological and economic supremacy. Notorious "Japan-bashing" took place alongside the image of Japan as superhuman, which mimicked in some ways the image of the Soviet Union after it launched the first Sputnik satellite in 1957, and both events turned the spotlight on American education.

US bureaucrats purposely pushed that analogy. In 1982, Ernest Boyer, a former US Commissioner of Education, publicly declared, "What we need is another Sputnik" to reboot American education, and he said that "maybe what we should do is get the Japanese to put a Toyota into orbit." Japan was both a threat and a model for human resource development in education and the workforce, which merged with the image of Asian-Americans as the "model minority."

Both the animosity and the superhumanizing peaked in the 1980s, when the term "Japan bashing" became popular, but had largely faded by the late 1990s. Japan's waning economic fortunes in the 1990s, now known as the Lost Decade, coupled with an upsurge in the US economy as the Internet took off, largely crowded anti-Japanese sentiment out of the popular media.

== Yasukuni Shrine ==
The Yasukuni Shrine is a Shinto shrine in Tokyo, Japan. It is the resting place of thousands of not only Japanese soldiers, but also Korean and Taiwanese soldiers killed in various wars, mostly in World War II. The shrine includes 13 Class A criminals such as Hideki Tojo and Kōki Hirota, who were convicted and executed for their roles in the Japanese invasions of China, Korea, and other parts of East Asia after the remission to them under the Treaty of San Francisco. A total of 1,068 convicted war criminals are enshrined at the Yasukuni Shrine.

In recent years, the Yasukuni Shrine has become a sticking point in the relations of Japan and its neighbours. The enshrinement of war criminals has greatly angered the people of various countries invaded by Imperial Japan. In addition, the shrine published a pamphlet stating that "[war] was necessary in order for us to protect the independence of Japan and to prosper together with our Asian neighbors" and that the war criminals were "cruelly and unjustly tried as war criminals by a sham-like tribunal of the Allied forces". While it is true that the fairness of these trials is disputed among jurists and historians in the West as well as in Japan, the former Prime Minister of Japan, Junichiro Koizumi, has visited the shrine five times; every visit caused immense uproar in China and South Korea. His successor, Shinzo Abe, was also a regular visitor of Yasukuni. Some Japanese politicians have responded by saying that the shrine, as well as visits to it, is protected by the constitutional right of freedom of religion. Yasuo Fukuda, chosen Prime Minister in September 2007, promised "not to visit" Yasukuni.

== Derogatory terms ==
There are a variety of derogatory terms referring to Japan. Many of these terms are viewed as racist. However, these terms do not necessarily refer to the Japanese race as a whole; they can also refer to specific policies, or specific time periods in history.

=== In English ===
- Especially prevalent during World War II, the word "Jap" (short for Japanese) or "Nip" (short for Nippon, Japanese for "Japan" or Nipponjin for "Japanese person") has been used mostly in America, Great Britain, Canada, Australia, New Zealand, and Singapore as a derogatory word for the Japanese throughout the 19th and the 20th century when they came to Western countries, mostly the United States in large numbers. During WW2, some in the United States Marine Corps tried to combine the word Japs with apes to create a new description, Japes, for the Japanese, although this slur never became popular.
- The word Japanazi has also been used in English language media, a combination of the words "Japan" and "Nazi" (after Nazi Germany) as a derogatory word to insult Japan and the Axis powers in general.

=== In Chinese ===
- Riben guizi (Chinese: 日本鬼子; Cantonese: Yaatboon gwaizi; Mandarin: Rìběn guǐzi) – literally "Japanese devils" or "Japanese monsters". This is used mostly in the context of the Second Sino-Japanese War, when Japan invaded and occupied large areas of China. This is the title of a Japanese documentary on Japanese war crimes during WWII. Recently, some Japanese have taken the slur and reversed the negative connotations by transforming it into a cute female personification named Hinomoto Oniko, which is an alternate reading in Japanese.
- Wokou (Chinese: 倭寇; pinyin: wōkòu; Jyutping: wo1 kau3; Cantonese Yale: wō kau) – originally referred to Japanese pirates and armed sea merchants who raided the Chinese coastline during the Ming dynasty. The term was adopted during the Second Sino-Japanese War to refer to invading Japanese forces (similarly to Germans being called "Huns" In France and Britain). The word is today sometimes used to refer to all Japanese people in extremely negative contexts.
- Xiao Riben (Chinese: 小日本; pinyin: xiǎo Rìběn) – literally "puny Japan(ese)", or literally "little Japan(ese)". This term is very common (Google Search returns 21,000,000 results as of August 2007). The term can be used to refer to either Japan or individual Japanese people.
- Riben zai (Chinese: 日本仔; pinyin: rì běn zǎi; Jyutping: jat6 bun2 zai2; Cantonese Yale: yaht bún jái) – this is the most common term in use by Cantonese speaking Chinese, having similar meaning to the English word "Jap". The term literally translates to "Japanese kid". This term has become so common that it has little impact and does not seem to be too derogatory compared to other words below.
- Wo (Chinese: 倭; pinyin: wō) – this was an ancient Chinese name for Japan, but was also adopted by the Japanese. Today, its usage in Mandarin is usually intended to give a negative connotation. The character is said to also mean "dwarf", although that meaning was not apparent when the name was first used. See Wa.
- Riben gou (Chinese: 日本狗; pinyin: Rìběn gǒu; Jyutping: jat6 bun2 gau2; Cantonese Yale: yaht bún gáu) – "Japanese dogs". The word is used to refer to all Japanese people in extremely negative contexts.
- Da jiaopen zu (Chinese: 大腳盆族; pinyin: dà jiǎopén zú) – "big foot-basin race". Ethnic slur towards Japanese used predominantly by Northern Chinese, mainly those from the city of Tianjin.
- Huang jun (Chinese: 黃軍; pinyin: huáng jūn) – "Yellow Army", a pun on "皇軍" (homophone huáng jūn, "Imperial Army"), used during World War II to represent Imperial Japanese soldiers due to the colour of the uniform. Today, it is used negatively against all Japanese. Since the stereotype of Japanese soldiers are commonly portrayed in war-related TV series in China as short men, with a toothbrush moustache (and sometimes round glasses, in the case of higher ranks), huang jun is also often used to pull jokes on Chinese people with these characteristics, and thus "appear like" Japanese soldiers. Also, since the colour of yellow is often associated with pornography in modern Chinese, it is also a mockery of the Japanese forcing women into prostitution during World War II.
- Zi wei dui (Chinese: 自慰隊; pinyin: zì wèi duì; Jyutping: zi6 wai3 deoi6; Cantonese Yale: jih wai deuih) – a pun on the homophone "自衛隊" (same pronunciation, "self-defense forces", see Japan Self-Defense Forces), the definition of "慰" (Cantonese: wai3; pinyin: wèi) used is "to comfort". This phrase is used to refer to Japanese (whose military force is known as "自衛隊") being stereotypically hypersexual, as "自慰隊" means "self-comforting forces", referring to masturbation.
- Ga zai / Ga mui (Chinese: 㗎仔 / 㗎妹; Jyutping: gaa4 zai2 / gaa4 mui1; Cantonese Yale: gàh jái / gàh mūi) – used only by Cantonese speakers to call Japanese men / young girls. "㗎" (gaa4) came from the frequent use of simple vowels (-a in this case) in Japanese language. "仔" (zai2) means "little boy(s)", with relations to the stereotype of short Japanese men. "妹" (mui1) means "young girl(s)" (the speaker usually uses a lustful tone), with relations to the stereotype of disrespect to females in Japanese society. Sometimes, ga is used as an adjective to avoid using the proper word "Japanese".
- Law bak tau (Chinese: 蘿蔔頭; pinyin: luo bo tou; Jyutping: lo4 baak6 tau4; Cantonese Yale: lòh baahk tàuh) – "daikon head". Commonly used by the older people in the Cantonese-speaking world to call Japanese men.

=== In Korean ===
- Jjokbari (Korean: 쪽발이) – translates as "a person with cloven hoof-like feet". This term is the most frequently used and strongest ethnic slur used by Koreans to refer to Japanese. Refers to the traditional Japanese footwear of geta or tabi, both of which feature a gap between the big toe and the other four toes. The term compares Japanese to pigs. The term is also used by ethnic Koreans in Japan.
- Seom-nara won-sung-i (Korean: 섬나라 원숭이) – literally "island country monkey", more often translated as simply "island monkey". Common derogatory term comparing Japanese to the Japanese macaque native to Japan.
- Wae-in (Korean: 왜인; Hanja: 倭人) – translates as "small Japanese person", although used with strong derogatory connotations. The term refers to the ancient name of Yamato Japan, Wae, on the basis of the stereotype that Japanese people were small (see Wa).
- Wae-nom (Korean: 왜놈; Hanja: 倭놈) – translates as "small Japanese bastard". It is used more frequently by older Korean generations, derived from the Japanese invasions of Korea (1592–1598).
- Wae-gu (Korean: 왜구; Hanja: 倭寇) – originally referred to Japanese pirates, who frequently invaded Korea. The word is today used to refer to all Japanese people in an extremely negative context.

=== In Filipino ===
- Sakang is a Filipino insult meaning bow-legged, mainly directed towards Japanese people.

=== In Portuguese ===
- Japa is a term used in Brazil to refer to Japanese immigrants and their descendants many times accepted by the Japanese community, not analogous to English Jap.

=== Other ===
- Corona – There have been strong indications that the word "corona", from the coronavirus (referring specifically to the COVID-19 pandemic), has become a relatively common slur toward Japanese people in several Arabic-speaking countries, with the Japanese embassy in Egypt acknowledging that "corona" had become one of the most common slurs at least in that country, as well as incidents against Japanese aid workers in Palestine involving the slur. In Jordan, Japanese people were chased by locals yelling "corona". Outside of the Arabic-speaking world, France has also emerged as a notable country where use of the slur toward Japanese has become common, with targets of the slur ranging from Japanese study tours to Japanese restaurants and Japanese actresses working for French companies such as Louis Vuitton.

== See also ==
- 2012 China anti-Japanese demonstrations
- Anti-Chinese sentiment
- Anti-Japanese propaganda
- Anti-Japanese sentiment in the United States
- Anti-Korean sentiment
- Anti-Vietnamese sentiment
- China–Japan relations
- Discrimination against Otaku, often linked to anti-Japanese sentiment outside Japan
- Internment of Japanese Americans
- Internment of Japanese Canadians
- Japan–Korea disputes
- Japan–North Korea relations
- Japan–Russia relations
- Japan–South Korea relations
- Japan–United States relations
- Japanese war crimes
- John P. Irish (1843–1923), fought against anti-Japanese sentiment in California
- Kàngrì (抗日)
- Pacific War
- Japanese racial equality proposal, 1919
- Racism
  - Racism in Japan
  - Racism in the United States
- Second Sino-Japanese War
- Senkaku Islands
- Stereotypes of East Asians in the United States
- Tanaka Memorial
- Tatarophobia
- United States Executive Order 9066
- Yellow Peril
- Killing of Yoshihiro Hattori

== Bibliography ==
- Bagby, Wesley Marvin (1999). America's International Relations Since World War I. Oxford University Press. ISBN 0-19-512389-1.
- Chang, Maria Hsia, and Robert P. Barker. "Victor's justice and Japan's amnesia: The Tokyo war crimes trial reconsidered." East Asia: An International Quarterly 19.4 (2001): 55.
- Constantine, Peter (1992). Japanese Street Slang. Weatherhill. ISBN 0-8348-0250-3.
- Corbett, P. Scott. In the eye of a Hurricane: Americans in Japanese custody during World War II (Routledge, 2007).
- Dower, John. War without mercy: Race and power in the Pacific War (Pantheon, 2012).
- Emmott, Bill (1993). Japanophobia: The Myth of the Invincible Japanese. Times Books. ISBN 0-8129-1907-6.
- Futamura, Madoka. War crimes tribunals and transitional justice: The Tokyo trial and the Nuremberg legacy (Routledge, 2007). online
- MacArthur, Brian. Surviving the Sword: Prisoners of the Japanese in the Far East, 1942-45 (Random House, 2005).
- Maga, Timothy P. Judgment at Tokyo: the Japanese war crimes trials (University Press of Kentucky, 2001).
- Monahan, Evelyn, and Rosemary Neidel-Greenlee. All this hell: US nurses imprisoned by the Japanese (University Press of Kentucky, 2000).
- Navarro, Anthony V. (12 October 2000). "A Critical Comparison Between Japanese and American Propaganda during World War II".
- Nie, Jing-Bao. "The United States cover-up of Japanese wartime medical atrocities: Complicity committed in the national interest and two proposals for contemporary action." American Journal of Bioethics 6.3 (2006): W21-W33.
- Roces, Alfredo R. (1978). Filipino Heritage: The Spanish colonial period (late 19th century). Vol. 7 of Filipino Heritage: The Making of a Nation. Lahing Pilipino Pub.; [Manila].
- Schaffer, Ronald (1985). Wings of Judgement: American Bombing in World War II. New York: Oxford University Press.
- Tanaka, Yuki, and John W. Dower. Hidden horrors: Japanese war crimes in World War II (Routledge, 2019).
- Thorsten, Marie (2012). Superhuman Japan. Routledge. ISBN 978-0-415-41426-5.
- Totani, Yuma. The Tokyo War Crimes Trial: The Pursuit of Justice in the Wake of World War II (Harvard University Asia Center Publications Program, 2008) online review
- Tsuchiya, Takashi. "The imperial Japanese experiments in China." in The Oxford textbook of clinical research ethics (2008) pp: 31-45.
- Twomey, Christina. "Double displacement: Western women's return home from Japanese internment in the Second World War." Gender & History 21.3 (2009): 670-684. focus on British women
- Weingartner, James J. (February 1992). "Trophies of War: U.S. Troops and the Mutilation of Japanese War Dead, 1941–1945". Pacific Historical Review. 61 (1): 53–67. doi:10.2307/3640788. ISSN 0030-8684. JSTOR 3640788. S2CID 159919957.
- Yap, Felicia. "Prisoners of war and civilian internees of the Japanese in British Asia: the similarities and contrasts of experience." Journal of Contemporary History 47.2 (2012): 317-346.
- Filipinas, Volume 11, Issues 117-128. Filipinas Pub. 2002.
- Bijdragen tot de taal-, land- en volkenkunde van Nederlandsch-Indië, Volume 129. Contributor Koninklijk Instituut voor Taal-, Land- en Volkenkunde (Netherlands). M. Nijhoff. 1973.
