= Murder of Renisha McBride =

2013 murder in Dearborn Heights, Michigan

- Location of Dearborn Heights in the state of Michigan.
- Location: 42.340243°N 83.255449°W; West Outer Drive, Dearborn Heights, Michigan, U.S.
- Date: November 2, 2013; 4:42 am
- Attack type: Murder by shooting
- Weapon: Shotgun
- Victims: Renisha McBride, aged 19
- Perpetrator: Theodore Wafer
- Motive: Erroneous fear that McBride was trespassing
- Verdict: Guilty of all charges
- Convictions: Second-degree murder; Involuntary manslaughter (dismissed); Possession of a firearm during the commission of a felony
- Sentence: 17 to 32 years in prison

The murder of Renisha Marie McBride (April 11, 1994 – November 2, 2013), a 19-year-old African American woman, occurred on November 2, 2013, in Dearborn Heights, Michigan, United States. Renisha McBride crashed her car while intoxicated at a street in Detroit, and then walked to a neighborhood in Dearborn Heights where she knocked on the door of a house. The homeowner, 54-year-old Theodore Wafer, shot McBride with a shotgun. Wafer contended that the shooting was accidental and that he thought his home was being broken into after he heard her banging on his door at 4:42 in the morning.

Wafer was convicted of second-degree murder on August 7, 2014, and received a sentence of 17 to 32 years in prison. His sentence was re-affirmed in 2022.

== Shooting ==
Shortly before 1:00 am on November 2, 2013, McBride crashed her car at Bramell and Majestic on the west side of Detroit. A 911 caller reported that a woman had been speeding down the street, struck a parked car, got out of the vehicle, and then left on foot. Police initially considered the incident a low priority, so no officers were immediately dispatched. Forty minutes later, another call was placed indicating that the driver had returned. EMS arrived on the scene, but McBride had again walked away from the scene and was not treated. The owner of the parked car, who encountered McBride and called 911, told police that McBride was "discombobulated" and appeared to be in a "confused state of not knowing where she was and not being able to give a phone number or anything."

Shortly before 4:42 am, McBride was shot by homeowner Theodore Paul Wafer, 54, on the porch of his Dearborn Heights home, more than three hours after she crashed her car about a mile away. Wayne County Prosecutor Kym Worthy stated Wafer opened his front door and fired a shotgun blast through a screen door, hitting McBride in her head.

It is unclear what McBride was doing during the three hours between the crash and the fatal shooting. Her family claimed she was looking for help after becoming disoriented by the crash, during which she may have sustained a head injury. Wafer initially stated to police that he thought his home was being broken into and that he had accidentally fired his 12-gauge shotgun.

== Prosecution of Theodore Wafer ==
On November 15, 2013, the Wayne County's prosecutor office announced its decision to prosecute Wafer for second-degree murder, manslaughter, and possession of a firearm during commission of a felony. Wafer faced a maximum possible sentence of life imprisonment for the second-degree murder charge and 15 years for manslaughter, and an additional two years for the felony gun charge.

The trial began on July 21, 2014. Wafer was found guilty of all three charges on August 7, 2014. On September 3, 2014, Wafer was sentenced to 17 to 32 years of prison. He received 15 to 30 years for second-degree murder, and a mandatory two-year sentence for the felony firearms charge.

In February 2022, the Michigan Supreme Court ordered that Wafer be resentenced stating that Wafer's double jeopardy rights were violated by being convicted of two things: second-degree murder and involuntary manslaughter based on one act. On June 22, 2022, Wafer was sentenced to 17 years. He will be eligible to apply for parole in 2031.

== Reaction ==
McBride's murder is one of several deaths of African-Americans protested by the Black Lives Matter movement.

Comparisons have also been made to the September 14, 2013, shooting death of Jonathan Ferrell. Ferrell, who was African American, was shot 10 times and killed by a white police officer, Randall Kerrick. Like McBride, Ferrell had been involved in an automobile accident. He was allegedly running toward Kerrick when he was shot. Kerrick was charged with voluntary manslaughter. His trial ended in a hung jury and he was not retried.

== See also ==
- List of homicides in Michigan
- Werner Spitz, defense witness and former Wayne County medical examiner
- Killing of Yoshihiro Hattori
- Shooting of Ralph Yarl
- Shooting of Kaylin Gillis
