= Kansas City shooting =

Kansas City shooting may refer to:

- Kansas City massacre (1933)
- Overland Park Jewish Community Center shooting (2014)
- Shooting of Ralph Yarl (2023)
- 2024 Kansas City parade shooting

== See also ==
- Crime in Kansas City, Missouri
- List of mass shootings in the United States
