= Killing of Yoshihiro Hattori =

1992 shooting in Louisiana, US

- Hattori in San Francisco in 1992
- Location: Baton Rouge, Louisiana, U.S.
- Date: October 17, 1992; 34 years ago
- Attack type: Child homicide by shooting
- Weapon: .44 Magnum revolver
- Victims: Yoshihiro Hattori (服部 剛丈), aged 16
- Assailant: Rodney Peairs
- Motive: Erroneous belief that Hattori was trespassing with criminal intent; possibly racism
- Charges: Manslaughter
- Verdict: Not guilty
- Litigation: Rodney Peairs found liable in civil trial, ordered to pay US$650,000 ($1.41 million today) to Hattori's parents in damages

Yoshihiro Hattori (服部 剛丈, Hattori Yoshihiro; November 22, 1975 – October 17, 1992, often referred to as Yoshi Hattori) was a Japanese student on an exchange program to the United States who was shot to death in Baton Rouge, Louisiana. The shooting happened when Hattori, on his way to a Halloween party, went to the wrong house by mistake. Property owner Rodney Peairs (/ˈpɪərz/) fatally shot Hattori, erroneously thinking that he was trespassing with criminal intent. The killing and Peairs's trials received worldwide attention, initiating discussion about race relations and attitudes toward Asians in the United States.

Peairs was acquitted of manslaughter at a criminal trial, but at a civil trial he was found liable for Hattori's death. The court awarded Hattori's parents US$650,000 ($1.41 million today) against Peairs in damages.

== Hattori's early life ==
Yoshihiro Hattori was born in Nagoya, Aichi Prefecture, Japan, the second of the three children of Masaichi Hattori, an engineer, and his wife Mieko Hattori. He was 16 years old when he went to Baton Rouge, Louisiana, United States, in August 1992 as part of the American Field Service (AFS) student exchange program; he had also received a scholarship from the Morita Foundation for his trip. Hattori was hosted as a homestay student in Baton Rouge by Richard and Holley Haymaker (a college professor and a physician, respectively) and their teenage son, Webb.

== Killing ==
Two months into his stay in the U.S., Hattori and his homestay brother Webb Haymaker received an invitation to a Halloween party on October 17, 1992, organized for Japanese exchange students. Hattori went dressed in a white tuxedo in imitation of John Travolta's character in the film Saturday Night Fever. At about 8 p.m., Haymaker and Hattori drove to the neighborhood in East Baton Rouge Parish where the party was being held. The two youths mistook the residence of Rodney Peairs, a 30-year-old supermarket butcher, and his wife, Bonnie Peairs, for their intended destination due to the similarity of the address and the Halloween decorations on the outside of the house.

Hattori and Haymaker walked to the house's front door and rang the doorbell. Nobody came to the front door, but Bonnie Peairs opened the side door leading to the carport and saw Haymaker standing a few yards away. Haymaker was wearing a neck brace due to a recent injury and bandages as part of a Halloween costume. Haymaker attempted to address Bonnie Peairs, but she later testified that she panicked when Hattori appeared from around the corner and moved briskly towards her. She slammed the door and told her husband Rodney to get his gun.

Outside, Haymaker concluded that he and Hattori had come to the wrong house. They were preparing to return to their car when Rodney Peairs opened the carport door, armed with a .44 Magnum revolver. Hattori stepped back towards Peairs, saying, "We're here for the party." Peairs pointed the gun at him and yelled, "Freeze!" Haymaker had caught sight of the firearm and shouted a warning after Hattori, but Hattori had limited English and was not wearing his contact lenses that evening; it is possible that he did not understand Peairs's command to "freeze" and did not see the weapon, or might even have thought that this was part of a Halloween prank. Hattori was also holding a camera which Peairs mistook for a weapon. When Hattori continued moving towards Peairs, Peairs fired his gun at him from a distance of about 5 feet (1.5 m) away, hitting him in the chest, and then retreated back inside the house. Haymaker ran to the home next door for help, returning with a neighbor to find Hattori badly wounded and lying on his back. The Peairses did not come out of their house until the police arrived about forty minutes after the shooting. Bonnie Peairs shouted to a neighbor to "go away" when the neighbor called for help.

The shot pierced the upper and lower lobes of Hattori's left lung and exited through the area of the seventh rib; he died in an ambulance minutes later from blood loss.

== Legal proceedings ==
=== Criminal trial of Rodney Peairs ===
Initially, the Baton Rouge Police Department quickly questioned and released Rodney Peairs and declined to charge him with any crime because—in their view—Peairs had been "within his rights in shooting the trespasser." Only after Louisiana Governor Edwin Edwards and the Japanese consul in New Orleans protested was Peairs charged with manslaughter.

Peairs's defense was his claim that Hattori had an "extremely unusual manner of moving" that any reasonable person would find "scary." It emphasized that Peairs was an "average Joe", a man just like the jury members' neighbors, a man who "liked sugar in his grits."

At trial, Peairs testified about the moment just before the shooting: "It was a person, coming from behind the car, moving real fast. At that point, I pointed the gun and hollered, 'Freeze!' The person kept coming toward me, moving very erratically. At that time, I hollered for him to stop. He didn't; he kept moving forward. I remember him laughing. I was scared to death. This person was not gonna stop: he was gonna do harm to me." Peairs testified that he shot Hattori once in the chest when the youth was about 5 feet (1.5 m) away. "I felt I had no choice," he said. "I'm very sorry that any of this ever happened." A police detective testified that Peairs had said to him, "Boy, I messed up; I made a mistake."

District Attorney Doug Moreau concentrated on establishing that it had not been reasonable for Peairs, a 6-foot-2-inch (1.88 m) tall, armed man, to be so fearful of a polite, friendly, unarmed, 130-pound (59 kg) boy who rang the doorbell, even if he walked toward him unexpectedly in the carport, and that Peairs was not justified in using deadly force.

The defense further argued that Rodney Peairs was, in large part, reacting reasonably to his wife's panic. Bonnie Peairs testified for an hour about the incident, during which she also cried several times. "He [Hattori] was coming real fast towards me," she testified. "I had never had somebody come at me like that before. I was terrified." Rodney Peairs did not hesitate or question her but instead went to retrieve a handgun with a laser sight stored in a suitcase in the bedroom. "There was no thinking involved. I wish I could have thought. If I could have just thought," Bonnie Peairs said. While giving a description of Hattori at the trial, Bonnie Peairs said, "I guess he appeared Oriental. He could have been Mexican or whatever. He was taller than me, and his skin was darker colored."

The trial lasted seven days. The jury returned a not guilty verdict after deliberating for approximately three hours. (Note: According to The New York Times, the jury deliberated for "just over three hours", whereas The Washington Post reported that the jury returned its verdict in "less than three hours.") Courtroom spectators applauded when the verdict was announced.

=== Civil trial ===
In a later civil action, however, the court found Rodney Peairs liable to Hattori's parents for US$650,000 in damages, which they used to establish two charitable funds in their son's name: one to fund U.S. high school students wishing to visit Japan and one to fund organizations that lobby for gun control.

The Hattoris' lawyers argued that the Peairses had acted unreasonably: Bonnie Peairs overreacted to the presence of two teens outside her house; the couple behaved unreasonably by not communicating with each other to convey what exactly the perceived threat was; they had not taken the best path to safety—remaining inside the house and calling the police; they had erred in taking offensive action rather than defensive action; and Rodney Peairs had used his firearm too quickly, without assessing the situation, firing a warning shot, or shooting to wound. Furthermore, the much larger Peairs could easily have subdued the short, slightly built Hattori. Contrary to Rodney Peairs's claim that Hattori was moving strangely and quickly towards him, forensic evidence demonstrated that Hattori was moving slowly, or not at all, and his arms were away from his body, indicating he was no threat. Overall, a far greater show of force was used than was appropriate.

The Peairses appealed the decision, but the Louisiana Court of Appeals upheld the judgment in October 1995, and a second appeal to the Supreme Court of Louisiana was rejected in January 1996. Of the total US$650,000 judgment, Rodney Peairs's insurance company paid US$100,000, while Peairs himself was left responsible for paying the remaining US$550,000. As of 2022, the Hattoris had been paid only $100,000 in compensation.

== Aftermath ==
After the trial, Peairs told the press that he would never again own a gun. A 2013 source reported that he had lost his home and his supermarket job following the shooting and was living in a trailer park.

The Japanese public was shocked by the killing and by Peairs's acquittal. Hattori's parents and his American host parents, the Haymakers, went on to become active campaigners for gun law reform in the U.S. In November 1993 they met with President Bill Clinton, who was presented with a petition signed by 1.7 million Japanese citizens urging stronger gun control. A petition signed by 120,000 American citizens was also presented to Congress. The Hattoris and the Haymakers lent their support to the Brady Bill (originally introduced into the U.S. House of Representatives in 1991), which mandated background checks and a five-day waiting period for the purchase of firearms in the U.S. It was signed into law by President Clinton on November 30, 1993, as the Brady Handgun Violence Prevention Act. According to Walter Mondale, then U.S. ambassador to Japan, who presented Hattori's parents with a copy of the Act on December 3, 1993, Hattori's death "had a very definite impact on passage of the Brady bill." (Note: Had the Brady Handgun Violence Prevention Act been in effect prior to Hattori's death, it likely would not have prevented his shooting, as its provisions would not have stopped the sale of the licensed handgun that killed him.) The Hattori and Haymaker families remained active in gun control activism. In March 2018, following the Stoneman Douglas High School shooting, the Hattoris participated in the March for Our Lives and spoke with survivors.

Following the killing, some argued that had Hattori been white, Bonnie Peairs may have not reacted the way she did. The Haymakers stated in an interview following the trial that had Hattori been white, they believed he would have never been killed, noting that Bonnie Peairs said that she first noticed that Hattori was "darker colored" than her. Some in Baton Rouge had said that Bonnie Peairs was frightened because she believed that Hattori was a light-skinned black man. Bonnie Peairs rejected notions that her reaction had been racially motivated, stating that, "... it was his fast movement toward that door that scared me so bad, not the color of his skin."

In 1997, filmmaker Christine Choy released a documentary film about Hattori's death called The Shot Heard Round The World.

Dick Haymaker established two endowed scholarships designed to honor Yoshi: the Yoshihiro Hattori Memorial Scholarship, which provides financial aid to students from Japan, and the Yoshihiro Hattori Memorial Fund for Off-Campus Study, which is available for those who plan to study in Japan. The Hattori family donated some of the $100,000 they received to gun reform groups and launched the Yoshi Foundation, an exchange program for American high school students to spend a year in Japan where they can experience life without gun violence.

Webb Haymaker died by suicide in March 2022 at the age of 46. According to his loved ones, he was haunted by survivor's guilt and for many years, "deeply, outwardly affected."

== See also ==
- Castle doctrine
- Killing of Latasha Harlins
- Killing of Vincent Chin
- Murder of Renisha McBride
- Murders of Haile Kifer and Nicholas Brady
- Shooting of Kaylin Gillis
- Shooting of Ralph Yarl
