= 2023 Texas shooting =

2023 Texas shooting may refer to:

- 2023 Allen, Texas mall shooting
- 2023 Austin shootings
- 2023 Cleveland, Texas shooting
- 2023 El Paso shooting
- Shooting of Payton Washington

== See also ==
- List of shootings in Texas
- List of mass shootings in the United States in 2023
