= Shooting of Payton Washington =

Shooting attack in Texas, U.S.

- Location: 30.3462°N 97.3841°W; 1080 US-290; Elgin, Texas, U.S.
- Date: April 18, 2023 c. 12:00 a.m. (CST)
- Attack type: Shooting
- Deaths: 0
- Injuries: 2
- Accused: Pedro Tello Rodriguez Jr.
- Charges: Deadly conduct

Just after midnight on April 18, 2023, competitive cheerleaders Payton Washington and Heather Roth were shot and wounded after Roth mistakenly entered a vehicle she had thought to be hers in an H-E-B supermarket parking lot in Elgin, Texas, United States. Washington was critically wounded in the shooting.

The shooting gained notoriety for being one of four shootings that occurred in a one-week period in the US that were characterized by young people being met with gunfire after making a mistake. The cheerleaders were shot five days after the shooting of Ralph Yarl in Kansas City, Missouri, after he rang the wrong doorbell; three days after the murder of Kaylin Gillis in Hebron, New York, after she entered the wrong driveway; and earlier on the same day that Kinsley White and her parents were shot by a neighbor in Gastonia, North Carolina, when her basketball rolled into his yard.

== Background ==
At the time of the shooting, Payton Washington (born February 4, 2005) was a cheerleader at Stony Point High School. She was born with a cyst on one of her lungs that required part of her lung to be removed through surgery. Washington became involved in gymnastics after doctors informed her mother, Angela, that it would help improve her lung capacity. Washington excelled at gymnastics and became involved in competitive cheerleading and eventually joined the Woodsland Elite Cheer Company.

Washington and Roth were part of a four-person group of cheerleaders who were using the parking lot of the H-E-B supermarket in Elgin to carpool from the Round Rock area to Woodlands Elite Cheer Company in Oak Ridge North for practice, a 360-mile round trip.

Texas had a "stand your ground" law at the time of the incident, which allows individuals to use deadly force in self defense without first attempting to retreat.

== Incident ==
Payton Washington, aged 18, Heather Roth, aged 21, and two other Woodlands Elite Cheer Company cheerleaders were returning to their vehicles in the H-E-B parking lot when Roth mistakenly opened the door of a vehicle she thought to be hers, and found the suspect in the passenger seat. After initially panicking and thinking there was a stranger in her car, she got inside the vehicle of one of her friends. The suspect then exited his vehicle, and Roth rolled down the car window to apologize to him, but he threw up his hands and opened fire, shooting 14 times and wounding her and Washington. After being fired upon, the group sped away together in a vehicle before eventually pulling over where the extent of Washington's injuries were realized.

After shooting the two women, the suspect allegedly fled the scene and went to his house, where he was arrested by police. The H-E-B manager witnessed the shooting and identified him as the suspect.

== Victims ==
Two of the cheerleaders were wounded in the shooting. Heather Roth was grazed by a bullet, but Payton Washington was shot three times, twice in the leg and once in the right side of her back, causing severe damage to her pancreas and diaphragm. As a result of her injuries, Washington had to have her spleen and part of her pancreas removed. Washington spent a week in the hospital and underwent several months of rehabilitation.

== Accused ==
The suspect was identified as 25-year-old Pedro Tello Rodriguez Jr., an Elgin resident at the time of the shooting. Rodriguez was arrested in connection with the shooting later the same day after the supermarket manager identified him and surveillance footage connected him to the incident. He was held on a $500,000 bond. In August 2024, he was charged with two felony counts, including deadly conduct discharging a firearm and aggravated assault with a deadly weapon. At his first hearing on November 6, 2024, his attorney stated: "Pedro was understandably startled by the sudden intrusion by Ms. Washington. Pedro believed he was about to be robbed. Pedro had been robbed at gunpoint previously. Pedro continues to wish Ms. Washington a full recovery."

== Aftermath ==
In the wake of her shooting, after being thrust into the national spotlight due to similar high-profile shooting incidents in Missouri and New York, Washington initially tried to stay out of the spotlight. Washington was invited twice to Washington D.C. by the White House Office of Gun Violence Prevention, which was established five months after she was shot. It was there that Washington met other gun violence survivors and found solace in sharing her experience with them. Washington expressed dissatisfaction with the current state of gun culture in the United States, stating, "At my age, people are just walking around with [guns] like it's an accessory" and "Something needs to change with that, because the longer that goes, the worse it's going to get, and the more people my age are going to die".

On September 26, 2024, she attended an executive order signing ceremony at the White House. The executive order, signed by president Joe Biden, was aimed at combating threats from the firearm black market and improving active shooter drills at schools.

=== Athletics ===
In April 2024, Washington helped the Baylor Bears win its ninth consecutive cheerleading national title. She was named a National Collegiate Acrobatics & Tumbling Association (NCATA) All-American and Division I Freshman of the Year. The following year, Washington won the NCATA Division I Athlete of the Year award and was named to the All-American team for a second consecutive time.

== Reactions ==
Connecticut senator Chris Murphy, a Democrat, said while speaking on the Senate floor that the nation was "becoming a heavily armed nation so fearful and angry and hair-trigger anxious that gun murders are now just the way in which we work out our frustrations" and described the nation as a "dystopia". Murphy said in reference to the shootings that "Cheerleaders don’t need to be shot when they walk into the wrong car. Teenagers don’t need to be murdered because their music is too loud. Kids shouldn’t fear for their life when they go to school, or when they pick up their siblings from a house in the neighborhood" and added that the country could "do better".

The president of Everytown for Gun Safety, a gun control advocacy organization, John Feinblatt, commented after the shootings of Washington, Yarl, and Gillis that "the truth is that we are living in a nation that is increasingly shooting first and asking questions later" and that he believed people were fed up with it. A spokesman for the Second Amendment Foundation, a gun rights organization, said that he was "alarmed" by the shootings and stated that while people have a right to self-defense "there has to be a definable threat to your safety".
