= Hebron Valley Grange No. 1103 =

- U.S. National Register of Historic Places
- Location within New York Location within the United States
- Location: 3185 Cty Rte 30, West Hebron, New York
- Coordinates: 43°13′50″N 73°22′34″W
- Area: less than one acre
- Built: 1839
- Architectural style: Greek Revival
- NRHP reference No.: 06000649
- Added to NRHP: July 28, 2006

Hebron Valley Grange No. 1103, also known as West Hebron Methodist Church, is a historic grange building located in the hamlet of West Hebron, in the town of Hebron in Washington County, New York. It was originally built about 1839 as a Methodist meeting house on a site located 20 miles from its current location. It was moved a second time prior to 1874. In 1911, the building was purchased by a local Grange organization and used until December 1985. The original building is a three-by-three-bay, 1-story heavy timber-frame building. An addition was completed about 1874.

It was listed on the National Register of Historic Places in 2006.
