= Shooting of Ralph Yarl =

2023 shooting in Kansas City, Missouri

- Location: Kansas City, Missouri, U.S.
- Date: April 13, 2023 c. 10:00 p.m. (CST)
- Attack type: Shooting
- Victim: Ralph Yarl (survived)
- Assailant: Andrew Daniel Lester
- Charges: First-degree assault, armed criminal action
- Convictions: Second-degree assault (guilty plea)

The shooting of Ralph Yarl occurred on April 13, 2023, in Kansas City, Missouri, United States. The 16-year-old boy was shot twice after ringing the doorbell at the wrong house. Yarl was trying to pick up his twin brothers and mistakenly ended up at the wrong address.

Andrew Daniel Lester, an 84-year-old white man, was charged on April 17, 2023, with armed criminal action and first-degree assault, the equivalent of attempted murder in Missouri. The Clay County district attorney and Kansas City police chief stated that there was a "racial component" to the shooting. If convicted, Lester faced 10 years to life in prison.

National media attention rose toward this first of four unrelated shootings across the US that week, which were all characterized by young people sustaining gunfire for making a harmless mistake. The other three were the murder of Kaylin Gillis in Hebron, New York, after she entered the wrong driveway; the shooting of two cheerleaders in Elgin, Texas, after they entered the wrong car; and the shooting of Kinsley White and her parents in Gastonia, North Carolina, after her basketball rolled into a neighbor's yard.

A trial was scheduled for October 7, 2024, but in September a judge ordered a mental health evaluation for October 8. On February 14, 2025, Lester pleaded guilty to second-degree assault. Clay County prosecutors announced on February 19, 2025, that Lester had died from medical issues at the age of 86.

== Background ==
At the time of the shooting Ralph Yarl (born May 7, 2006), a 16-year-old African-American, was enrolled at Staley High School. His parents had emigrated to the United States from Liberia. Friends and family describe him as an academically gifted student and musician, intending to major in chemical engineering at Texas A&M University. He was described as a "lanky kid" at 5 feet 8 inches (173 cm) tall and 140 pounds (64 kg).

== Shooting ==
On the evening of April 13, Yarl was sent to get his siblings at the 1100 block of NE 115th Terrace. He mistakenly went to a home less than a block away on NE 115th Street and rang the doorbell. Investigators allege that Lester shot Yarl twice through the house's front glass door with a .32-caliber Smith & Wesson revolver. The Kansas City Police Department responded to reports of a shooting near the home just before 10 p.m. Lester stated to the police that he believed that Yarl was trying to break in, and was "scared to death" of Yarl's size. Lester also claimed that Yarl put his hand on the door handle, though Yarl disputes this.

Yarl sought help at three different homes before someone finally complied. Neighbors had found him lying injured in the street and called police, who found him with at least two gunshot wounds to the head and arm.

== Accused ==
The suspect was identified as 84-year-old Andrew Daniel Lester (October 21, 1938 – February 19, 2025), an ex-Virginia resident and former Vietnam War military airman veteran, technician, and longtime airline mechanic for now-defunct America West Airlines. Lester grew up in Jewell Ridge, Virginia, and had resided in several places over the years, including El Paso, Texas, Mesa, Arizona, and El Segundo, California. Lester had lived in Kansas City since the mid-1990s. His grandson, who also resided in Kansas City at the time of the shooting, said that Lester held a negative view of minorities, while other family members disputed this characterization.

== Legal proceedings ==
On the early morning of April 14, Lester was taken into custody. No initial charges were filed, he was briefly held in custody, and was listed as "out of custody" and "general release" status on the same day.

The Clay County, Missouri prosecutor's office stated on April 17 that it had not received a criminal referral from the Kansas City Police Department about the shooting. Later that day, it was announced that Lester would be charged with first-degree assault and armed criminal action. First-degree assault is the State of Missouri's name for the charge that other states call attempted murder. The district attorney and chief of police stated there was a "racial component" to the case. Assistant prosecuting attorney Alexander Higginbotham clarified that "there is not a racial element to the legal charges that were filed". Legal experts noted this was likely because a hate crime charge would have carried a lower maximum sentence. Lester surrendered to authorities on April 18, and was released on bail later that day.

Lester's first court appearance was on June 1, with preliminary hearing dates set for August 31 and September 1. The Clay County judge also agreed to partially seal the case in response to a protective order filed by Lester's attorney, causing for the discovery in the case to be only shared with the prosecutors and not the public. This is partly due to the "wide-ranging publicity" that has cast Lester "in a negative light" which Lester's defense claims has continued to erode his ability to have a fair trial. The trial was scheduled to begin on October 7, 2024, but was rescheduled for February 18, 2025.

On February 14, 2025, four days before the trial was set to begin, Lester pled guilty to a lesser charge of second-degree assault, and was set to be sentenced in March; prosecutors were seeking a five-year prison sentence. However, on February 19, 2025, prosecutors announced that Lester had died at the age of 86. Defense attorney Steve Salmon said that Lester had both heart and memory issues, a broken hip, and had lost over 50 pounds (23 kg) since the shooting. In a statement, Yarl's family said that "While Lester finally admitted guilt, it came at the very last moment – after two years of stalling" and that news of his death "brings a mix of emotions, but it does not bring justice". Because of Lester's death before legal proceedings were finalized, he was not yet considered a felon under Missouri law, and prosecutors will move to dismiss the case.

=== Family lawsuit ===
On April 29, 2024, a lawsuit was filed by Yarl's mother Cleopatra Nagbe in the circuit court of Clay County, Missouri, accusing Lester and the Highland Acres Homes Association, Inc. of "careless and negligent conduct".

== Aftermath ==
In a weekend rally, the community and the family marched to and demonstrated in front of the suspected shooter's home, calling for official charges to be filed. A GoFundMe campaign was created by Yarl's aunt to cover his medical bills, receiving more than $2 million in donations by April 17 and $3.3 million in three total days.

Yarl was discharged from the hospital on April 16. President Joe Biden called Yarl and his mother to discuss his recovery. Yarl, family, and friends later participated in the "Going the Distance for Brain Injury" event in Kansas City, Missouri, which is a yearly Memorial Day event at Loose Park. Ahead of the event, Yarl's aunt spoke to reporters and stated that though Yarl was excited to return to his normal routine, they had to remind him to slow down as he suffers from debilitating migraines, balance issues, mood changes, and emotion comprehension along with PTSD from the shooting.

== Response ==
Sympathies were publicly expressed on television news or at demonstrations, by Kansas City leaders including Mayor Quinton Lucas and KCPD Chief Stacey Graves. Yarl's family retained civil rights attorney Benjamin Crump shortly after the shooting, who stated that there was "no excuse" for the release of the suspect and demanded swift legal action.

== See also ==
- Killing of Yoshihiro Hattori, a 1992 killing in Baton Rouge, Louisiana, United States
- Murder of Renisha McBride, a 2013 killing in Dearborn Heights, Michigan, United States
- Murder of Kaylin Gillis, a 2023 killing in Hebron, New York, United States
