= Hebron District School No. 16 =

- U.S. National Register of Historic Places
- Location within New York Location within the United States
- Location: 194 County Road 30, East Hebron, New York
- Coordinates: 43°15′44″N 73°17′14″W
- Area: Less than 1.0 acre (0.40 ha)
- Built: c. 1847
- Architectural style: Greek Revival
- NRHP reference No.: 12000211
- Added to NRHP: April 16, 2012

Hebron District School No. 16, also known as the Munson Hollow School, District School No. 12, and District School No. 2, is a historic one-room school building located at East Hebron, Washington County, New York. It was built about 1847, and is a one-story, rectangular, building with modest Greek Revival style design elements. It has a moderately pitched gable roof and is of stacked plant construction with a slate foundation. It housed a school until 1944, after which it was used as a community center.

It was added to the National Register of Historic Places in 2012.
