= Anti-Japanese propaganda =

Anti-Japanese propaganda can refer to:

- American World War II anti-Japanese propaganda
- British World War II anti-Japanese propaganda
- Chinese World War II anti-Japanese propaganda
