= Morita Foundation =

Foundation

The Morita Foundation was conceived and headed by Sony co-founder and chairman until 1994 Akio Morita.
