= 2019 boycott of Japanese products in South Korea =

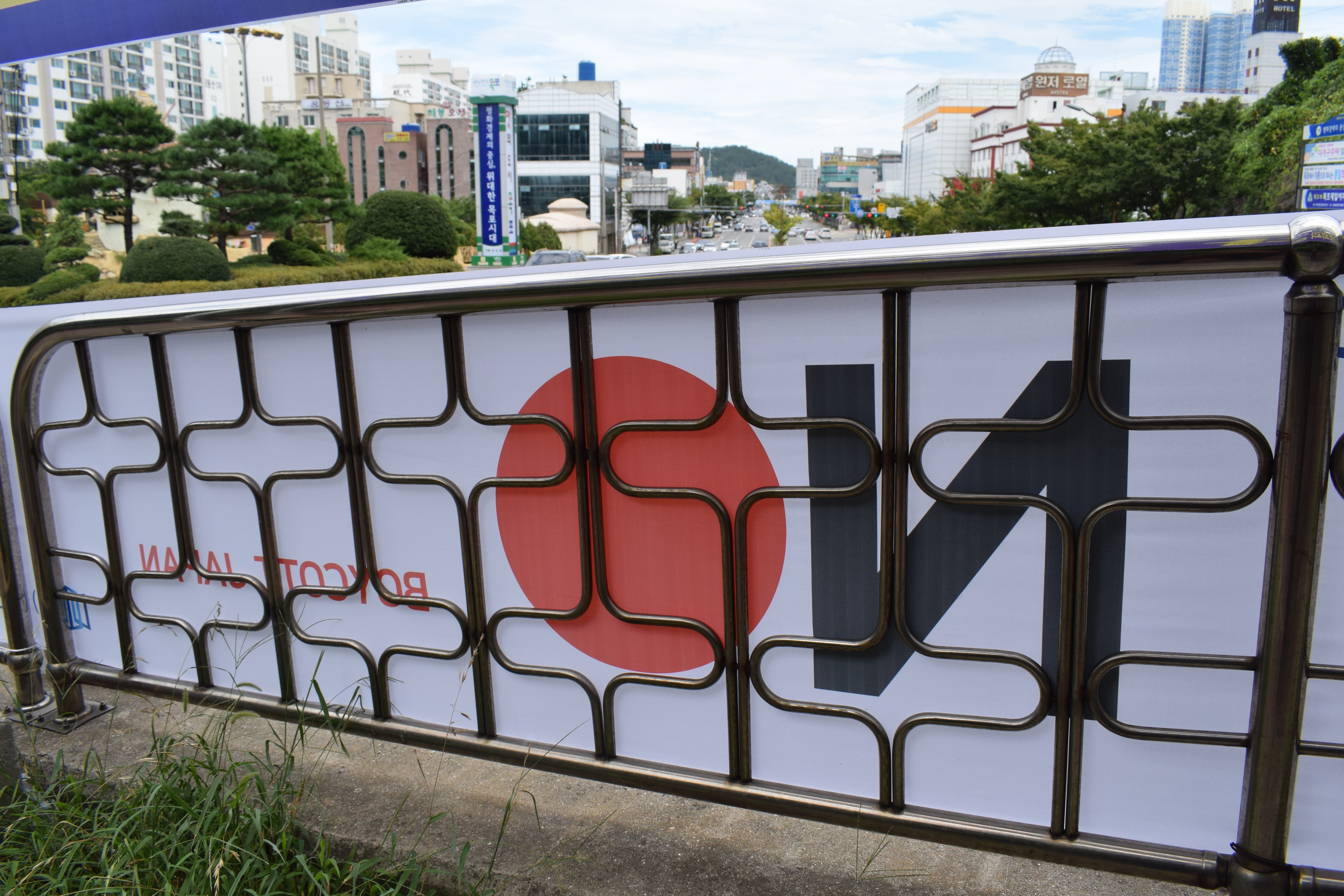
Banner in South Korea in 2019

In 2019, the boycott of Japanese products and travel began in South Korea due to trade disputes between South Korea and Japan.

== History ==
In 2019, a new wave of boycotts were started in South Korea as a response to the Japan–South Korea trade dispute. People participating in the movement stopped buying Japanese products and services, travelling to Japan, and watching Japanese-made films.

Boycotts of Japanese products and services in South Korea have affected Japanese brands and tourism to Japan. On July 29, 2019, a Korean credit card company reported that credit card sales from Muji fell by 33.4%, ABC Mart sales fell by 11.4% and Daigaku Honyaku Center fell by 55.3%. Uniqlo sales dropped by 40% and the company announced it will close down its Jongno 3-ga store in central Seoul. Similarly, credit card spending from South Koreans in Japan have also declined. JTB Corporation reported that the number of Koreans visiting Japan declined by about 10%. Some South Korean airlines announced they will reduce flights or suspend direct routes between major Japanese and South Korean cities.

The boycott of Japanese products spread into the cultural sector, with the latest release of the Doraemon film series Doraemon: Nobita's Chronicle of the Moon Exploration, which was originally scheduled for release on August 14, had been postponed indefinitely even after the film's Korean dubbing was finished. In July, two other anime films, Butt Detective the Movie and Detective Conan: The Fist of Blue Sapphire, was subjected to unfavourable online reviews on internet and sold only 134,000 and 200,000 tickets respectively.

A poll conducted by Realmeter involving 504 adults reveal that on 24 July 2019, said that 62.8% of respondents say they are boycotting Japanese goods. Another poll conducted by Gallup Korea involving 1,005 adults found that only 12% held favourable views on Japan, while 77% have negative views. Likewise the poll found that 61% of respondents blame the Japanese government for the conflict, while 17% hold the South Korean government responsible.

A new poll conducted by Embrian involving 1000 adults reveal that, as of December 2, 2020, 71.8% of respondents say they are participating in boycotting Japanese goods.

== Japan's Response ==
Due to the boycott, Japanese companies' sales in exports to Korea dropped by 99.9% from the previous year. The Chief Cabinet Secretary of Japan officially expressed dissatisfaction, stating through the Japanese broadcaster NHK that although the diplomatic situation between Korea and Japan is serious, the Korean people should respond sensibly to the boycott of Japanese products which is damaging to Japanese companies.
