= Hebron, New York =

Hebron
- Town
- Location in Washington County and the state of New York.
- Coordinates: 43°17′16″N 73°20′3″W
- Country: United States
- State: New York
- County: Washington

Area
  - Total: 56.42 sq mi (146.12 km^{2})
  - Land: 56.11 sq mi (145.33 km^{2})
  - Water: 0.31 sq mi (0.79 km^{2})
- Elevation: 794 ft (242 m)

Population (2010)
  - Total: 1,853
  - Estimate (2016): 1,809
  - Density: 32.2/sq mi (12.45/km^{2})
- Time zone: UTC-5 (Eastern (EST))
  - Summer (DST): UTC-4 (EDT)
- ZIP codes: 12832 and 12865
- Area code: 518
- FIPS code: 36-33040
- GNIS feature ID: 0979059
- Website: Town website

Hebron is a town in Washington County, New York, United States. It is part of the Glens Falls Metropolitan Statistical Area. The town population was 1,773 at the 2000 census. The town is named after the ancient city of Hebron, in the present-day West Bank.

== Geography ==
Hebron's hills and valleys are part of the slate valley of the Upper Taconic Mountains (Taghkanic, meaning 'in the trees'), and part of the Great Appalachian Valley (also known as the 'Great Valley'). Thus, many of the main hills, valleys, creeks and roads run diagonally across Hebron in keeping with the general outlay of the Appalachians.

Hebron is notably at once a nexus between valley regions within the 'Great Valley', and also between mountain regions. The nexus of the Champlain and Hudson Valleys (described in greater detail below in the paragraph on watersheds) is located here. The taller peaks of the Taconics are on the Vermont side of the border, and begin to dwindle comparatively into foothills in Hebron. Hebron can be described as the foothills between the Adirondack Mountains of New York, and the Taconic and Green Mountains of Vermont. Hebron thus is at once at a high point dividing valleys, and a lowlands dividing mountain areas.

According to the United States Census Bureau, the town has a total area of 56.4 square miles (146 km^{2}), of which 56.2 square miles (146 km^{2}) is land and 0.2 square miles (0.52 km^{2}) (0.32%) is water.

The eastern town line of Hebron is the Vermont border, and the beginning of New England proper. The town of Salem is adjacent to the south. The towns of Argyle, Hartford and Granville (famous for its colored slate) make up the remaining border on the western and northern edges.

NY Route 22 is a north–south highway through the eastern part of the town, running roughly parallel to the Vermont border. Route 30 connects Salem to Hartford through the western part of Hebron. Route 31, the longest road through Hebron, cuts across diagonally from Route 30 connecting West Hebron to West Pawlet, Vermont.

Hebron is at the threshold between two major watersheds whose waters travel great distances in opposite directions, only to rejoin in the Atlantic Ocean. The formal valleys and watersheds to which Hebron belongs are the following: Champlain Valley/Lake George Watershed—02010001 ; Hudson River Valley/Hudson-Hoosic Watershed—02020003 . Waters in the northernmost part of Hebron drain via the Mettawee River north into Lake Champlain, where they mix with waters from Lake George (Horican) and then flow into the Saint Lawrence River (Kaniatarowanenneh). These Hebron waters mingle in the Saint Lawrence with waters of all the Great Lakes as they flow northeastward into the Gulf of St. Lawrence, and join the Atlantic Ocean. Meanwhile, the majority of Hebron waters drain south via Black Creek into the Batten Kill (Dionondehowa) and then the Hudson River (Muh-he-kun-ne-tuk or Muhheakantuck), and flow south into the Atlantic Ocean just below New York City.

The two branches of Black Creek join in West Hebron just west of the village's main street, and after the waterfall in the West Branch of Black Creek (which is just before Patterson Road). See map . See the approximation of the watershed divide mapped in context of mountains and valleys . See Washington County for a set of contextual maps.

== Demographics ==
Historical population
| Census | Pop. | Note | %± |
|---|---|---|---|
| 1820 | 2,754 | | — |
| 1830 | 2,685 | | −2.5% |
| 1840 | 2,498 | | −7.0% |
| 1850 | 2,548 | | 2.0% |
| 1860 | 2,543 | | −0.2% |
| 1870 | 2,399 | | −5.7% |
| 1880 | 2,383 | | −0.7% |
| 1890 | 2,044 | | −14.2% |
| 1900 | 1,679 | | −17.9% |
| 1910 | 1,505 | | −10.4% |
| 1920 | 1,184 | | −21.3% |
| 1930 | 1,191 | | 0.6% |
| 1940 | 1,228 | | 3.1% |
| 1950 | 1,134 | | −7.7% |
| 1960 | 1,026 | | −9.5% |
| 1970 | 1,212 | | 18.1% |
| 1980 | 1,288 | | 6.3% |
| 1990 | 1,540 | | 19.6% |
| 2000 | 1,773 | | 15.1% |
| 2010 | 1,853 | | 4.5% |
| 2016 (est.) | 1,809 | | −2.4% |
U.S. Decennial Census

As of the census of 2000, there were 1,773 people, 687 households, and 489 families residing in the town. The population density was 31.5 inhabitants per square mile (12.2/km^{2}). There were 906 housing units at an average density of 16.1 per square mile (6.2/km^{2}). The racial makeup of the town was 97.18% White, 0.45% African American, 0.06% Native American, 0.45% Asian, 0.79% from other races, and 1.07% from two or more races. Hispanic or Latino of any race were 1.47% of the population.

There were 687 households, out of which 32.3% had children under the age of 18 living with them, 58.2% were married couples living together, 7.7% had a female householder with no husband present, and 28.8% were non-families. 22.1% of all households were made up of individuals, and 10.5% had someone living alone who was 65 years of age or older. The average household size was 2.57 and the average family size was 3.02.

In the town, the population was spread out, with 27.1% under the age of 18, 6.0% from 18 to 24, 28.4% from 25 to 44, 25.4% from 45 to 64, and 13.2% who were 65 years of age or older. The median age was 38 years. For every 100 females, there were 102.6 males. For every 100 females age 18 and over, there were 99.5 males.

The median income for a household in the town was $37,639, and the median income for a family was $41,680. Males had a median income of $28,150 versus $22,315 for females. The per capita income for the town was $18,113. About 7.0% of families and 9.7% of the population were below the poverty line, including 13.7% of those under age 18 and 9.4% of those age 65 or over.

== History ==
Settled in the late 18th century, Hebron was first known as the District of Black Creek. The British Crown granted parcels of land in the area, called "patents," to soldiers who served in the French and Indian War (1754–1763) (the North American front of the Seven Years' War). Most of the grants were to members of the Highland Scottish 77th Regiment. Many of the parcels were transferred from officers and soldiers to speculators, who sold them to New England and Scotch-Irish settlers. Some of the patents that form the town are Lintot, Blundell and Sheriff. Originals of these patents are held by the National Archives.

The town of Hebron was formed March 23, 1786, and named after Hebron, Connecticut. Its namesake is the biblical Hebron, the largest city in the present-day West Bank, 30 km south of Jerusalem.

The main road running north–south through the Hebron area, now named Route 22, used to be known as the “Great Northern Turnpike” (or “the Turnpike”). Two historic milepost markers remain in the town, one at 7047 State Route 22, the second just north of Chamberlin Mills Road. A third is just south of the town line with Salem, New York. A peddler's wagon belonging to Lorenzo Levi Brown of Hebron is in the wagon collection of the Museum of Long Island at Stony Brook, New York.

The town developed as an agricultural community, which it still is today. By 1864, it was the chief potato-producing area of Washington County. Potatoes have been superseded by dairy farming. In recent decades, farms have been consolidated into larger operations. While the town has numerous residents whose families have been in the area for three generations, it also has new part-time residents who have second homes here. Others have retired here for the beauty of the area.

=== Hebron Volunteer Fire Company ===
The West Hebron Volunteer Fire Company was formed in 1947. Willard Bain, a charter member, died in February 2008. The first fire truck, BRUSH 356, was put into service in 1947 and operated until 2008. It was retired after the purchase that spring of a CAFS truck ATTACK 356. In 1978, the East Hebron Fire Company was formed after the homes of Nelson Greene and Alfred "Pug" Getty burned down. Getty donated the land and Greene led the group of volunteers who built Station Two. The two companies later merged to form the Hebron Volunteer Fire Company. www.HebronVolunteerFireCompany.com

The Hebron Volunteer Fire Company First Response Team provides emergency medical services to the town. These firefighters/emergency medical technicians (EMTs) respond to medical and trauma-related calls. All first responders are licensed as EMTs by the State of New York. David Getty, a lifelong resident of Hebron, is Fire Chief.

=== Hebron Preservation Society ===
The Hebron Preservation Society was chartered by the State of New York in 1975. The Society maintains a museum, with collections held in two historic buildings located on the east side of Route 22 in the hamlet of East Hebron. The former one-room school house built in 1845 was acquired from the Salem School District, and a small tenant farm house, built in the early 19th century, was purchased in 1990. The society published HEBRON: A Century In Review in 1988, with a second edition in 2006. The museum houses a display of school house memorabilia, varied articles, ledgers, books, and family genealogies pertaining to the residents, businesses and organizations in Hebron.

=== Beauty of Hebron potato ===
The Beauty of Hebron potato variety was promoted by a local seedsman, Edward L. Coy (E.L. Coy). Both Coy and Rachel Campbell of Hebron took credit for the discovery. The variety was a naturally fertilized seedling of Garnet Chili. The earliest published reference to the Beauty of Hebron variety is from the 1876 Annual Agricultural Society Meeting in Marblehead, Massachusetts. The next year, in 1877 the US Department of Agriculture introduced the Beauty of Hebron potato to growers in 26 states for tests. Various major seed companies of the time claimed credit for its commercial introduction, including J. M. Thornburn of New York City, JJH Gregory of Marblehead, and Peter Henderson of New Jersey.

In 1879 Coy shipped "Hebron Beauties" to London. The Beauty of Hebron was one of the varieties used to restock the British Isles after the potato blight and Great Famine of Ireland. Its use spread throughout the British Empire to localities such as New Zealand and New Caledonia. By the turn of the 20th century, it was also a favorite of market and home gardeners in the United States. In 1946, the USDA did not list it in commercial production in the United States, but the 1959 Potato Variety Handbook of the American Potato Association includes the Beauty of Hebron. Most current tissue culture stocks and tubers came from Elmer Hansen of Alberta, Canada; in 1988 he provided seed to Will Bownall and the Seedsavers organization, devoted to preserving historic varieties.

The Beauty of Hebron is listed on the RAFT list of Threatened American Foods. The Beauty of Hebron is maintained at the Canadian Potato Research Centre in Fredericton, New Brunswick, Canada; the University of North Dakota Potato Breeding Program; and with a commercial breeder. As of 2008, it was not known if the potato variety was in commercial production. Due to Sally Brillion of the Hebron Preservation Society, amateur gardeners began to cultivate the Beauty of Hebron potato in 2006.

== Notable people ==
- Hiram Barton — former mayor of Buffalo, New York
- James M. Hinds — United States Representative from Arkansas's 2nd congressional district elected March 1868, assassinated in October 1868, born in East Hebron in December 1833
- Kevin Monahan — convicted murderer
- Homer Nelson — former member of the Wisconsin State Assembly
- Solomon Northup (1808-c. 1863) — born in Minerva, New York, free man of color who had a farm in Hebron, publisher of the bestselling memoir Twelve Years a Slave about his life, lecturer on the abolitionist circuit
- Samuel Stevens – Adjutant General of New York
- Ralph Randles Stewart — botanist

== Locations ==
There are seven hamlets in the town: Porter, Hebron, North Hebron, East Hebron, West Hebron, Belcher, and Slateville. The Town Clerk's office is located in West Hebron on County Route 30, as is the Hebron Volunteer Fire Company FireHall and Station One. Station Two is located on NY Route 22, south of the intersection of Sheldon Rd, Chamberlain Mill Road and NY-22. Hebron has no school buildings or town center now, but there were hotels, postal offices, and many schools in the past. Students now attend schools in the surrounding towns, primarily Granville and Salem. The northeastern half of Hebron is in the Granville zipcode 12832, and the bulk of the southwestern half is in the Salem zipcode 12865. In 2008, there was only a country store located at Bedlam Corners in the hamlet of West Hebron.

=== Communities ===
- Belcher – a hamlet near the western town line on County Road 30.
- Castle Green – A location near the western town line.
- East Hebron – A hamlet near the eastern town boundary on NY-22. The Hebron District School No. 16 was listed on the National Register of Historic Places in 2012.
- Hebron - <<not located>>
- North Hebron – A hamlet near the northern town line on County Road 31.
- Porter – A community north of East Hebron on NY-22.
- Slateville – A hamlet in the northeastern part of Hebron on County Road 31, east of North Hebron.
- Tiplady – A community south of East Hebron on NY-22.
- West Hebron (Chamberlain Mills) – A hamlet in the southwestern corner of the town on County Road 31. The Hebron Valley Grange No. 1103 was listed on the National Register of Historic Places in 2006.

=== Geographical features ===
- Barkley's Lake – A small lake north of West Hebron.
- Black Creek – A stream parallel to NY-22
- Black Creek Falls – in West Hebron on the West Branch of Black Creek, just before Patterson Hill Road
- Green Pond – A small lake northeast of Slateville.
- Grimes Hill – An elevation in the north part of the town.
- Hebron Mountain – A small mountain overlooking West Hebron from the northeast.
- Irwin Road Pond – A small lake west of East Hebron.
- Pine Hill – An elevation northeast of West Hebron.
- Smith Pond – A small lake south of North Hebron.
