= Murder of Kaylin Gillis =

2023 murder in Upstate New York

- Publicity photo of Kaylin Gillis
- Location: 1263 Patterson Hill Road Hebron, New York, U.S.
- Date: April 15, 2023
- Attack type: Murder by shooting
- Victim: Kaylin Gillis
- Perpetrator: Kevin D. Monahan
- Motive: Retaliation for a car driving into his driveway that he assumed were trespassers.
- Verdict: Guilty on all counts
- Convictions: Second-degree murder; First-degree reckless endangerment; Tampering with physical evidence
- Sentence: Life imprisonment with the possibility of parole after 26 3/4 years

On April 15, 2023, 20-year-old Kaylin Gillis was murdered in Hebron, New York, United States, after the car she was traveling in turned into the wrong driveway. The shooter, Kevin D. Monahan, was arrested after a standoff and taken into custody. In January 2024, he was convicted of second-degree murder, and on March 1, 2024, he was sentenced to 25 years to life in prison, plus a consecutive sentence of 21 months to 4 years in prison.

The shooting shared similarities with two other shootings in the U.S. that occurred in the same week, including the shooting of Ralph Yarl in Kansas City, Missouri, after he mistakenly rang the wrong doorbell, and the shooting of two cheerleaders in Elgin, Texas, after they entered the wrong car.

== Victim ==
Kaylin A. Gillis (born February 23, 2003) lived in Schuylerville, New York, and graduated from Schuylerville High School in 2021.

== Shooting ==
Kaylin Gillis was killed on April 15, 2023, just before 10 p.m., in Washington County, New York. Gillis and her friends were looking for a friend's house. Their vehicle was being driven by her boyfriend. Their car and another vehicle mistakenly pulled into the driveway of Kevin D. Monahan, who lived on a ridgetop plot in the rural town of Hebron, on Patterson Hill Road.

After turning into the wrong driveway, the group realized they had the wrong address, and began to back the vehicle out of the driveway to leave. Gillis was one of four people in the last car to pull away. As the group was leaving, Monahan exited his home and fired two shots at the vehicle using a 20-gauge shotgun. Gillis was struck in the neck. Unable to get cell phone reception in Hebron, the group drove toward the neighboring town of Salem, where they were able to reach 9-1-1. Gillis died before medical help could arrive.

After police arrived at Monahan's home, he initially refused to surrender to police officers and state troopers. During an hour-long standoff, he was on the phone with a police dispatcher and with his attorney before eventually surrendering. Eight police body-worn cameras captured his encounter with police. According to papers filed in Washington County Court, Monahan had initially claimed to police that he had been "in bed since 8:30 p.m." and suggested that hunters had been responsible for the killing.

== Perpetrator ==
Kevin D. Monahan (born October 28, 1957) was charged in the killing. He was born and raised in Salem, New York. Long-time neighbors described him as frequently hostile, sour, and sometimes aggressive. He had no criminal record in New York State but was arrested and charged in Vermont with aggravated assault with a weapon in 2001. That charge was later dismissed.

== Legal proceedings ==
After his arrest, Monahan was briefly held at Washington County Correctional Facility in Fort Edward, where Gillis's father is a correctional officer, before being taken 15 miles (24 km) away to the Warren County Jail in Lake George.

He was arraigned in Washington County Court on April 16, 2023, and pleaded not guilty to second-degree murder. He was denied bail at a hearing the next day, with the prosecuting attorney saying that Monahan's reputation as "confrontational and hot-tempered", in addition to the seriousness of the crime, weighed in favor of pretrial detention.

A new indictment was issued in May 2023; in addition to second-degree murder, he also faced charges of reckless endangerment and tampering with evidence. The murder charge was also reduced from "intentional murder" to "reckless depraved indifference murder." The court again denied his request for a bond. Jury selection for the trial was set to begin in September 2023, but following further procedural delays was postponed until October 30. On October 25, the presiding judge Adam Michelini granted a defense request for additional time to seek expert analysis of certain evidence. The court rescheduled the trial start date for January 8, 2024. Monahan's defense argued that Monahan believed that there was an ongoing home invasion when he armed himself after hearing the motorcycle of one of Gillis' friends. The defense and prosecution agreed that Monahan's first shot was a "warning shot", but his defense argued that Monahan's shotgun was defective and that the gun fired when he tripped on nails on the deck of his house.

On January 23, 2024, Monahan was found guilty of second-degree murder. On March 1, he was sentenced to 25 years to life in prison. Later, on March 14, Monahan was moved to Elmira Correctional Facility in Elmira, New York. He was later transferred to Wende Correctional Facility, where he is currently being held.

In August 2025, Monahan appealed his second-degree murder conviction, with his attorney Matthew Hug arguing that the trial was unfair and was rife with legal errors and that there was not sufficient evidence to have convicted him. Matthew Hug said that Monahan's killing of Gillis did not meet the legal requirement of convicting him for murder with depraved indifference as there was no proof that Monahan knew how many people were inside the vehicle he shot at. Hug also argued that a mistrial should've been declared after the jury was informed Monahan had violated a pretrial order. Hug claimed that the district attorney, Christian Morris, mocked Monahan during the trial and used "conspiratorial rhetoric".
