= Baodiao movement =

Chinese social movement

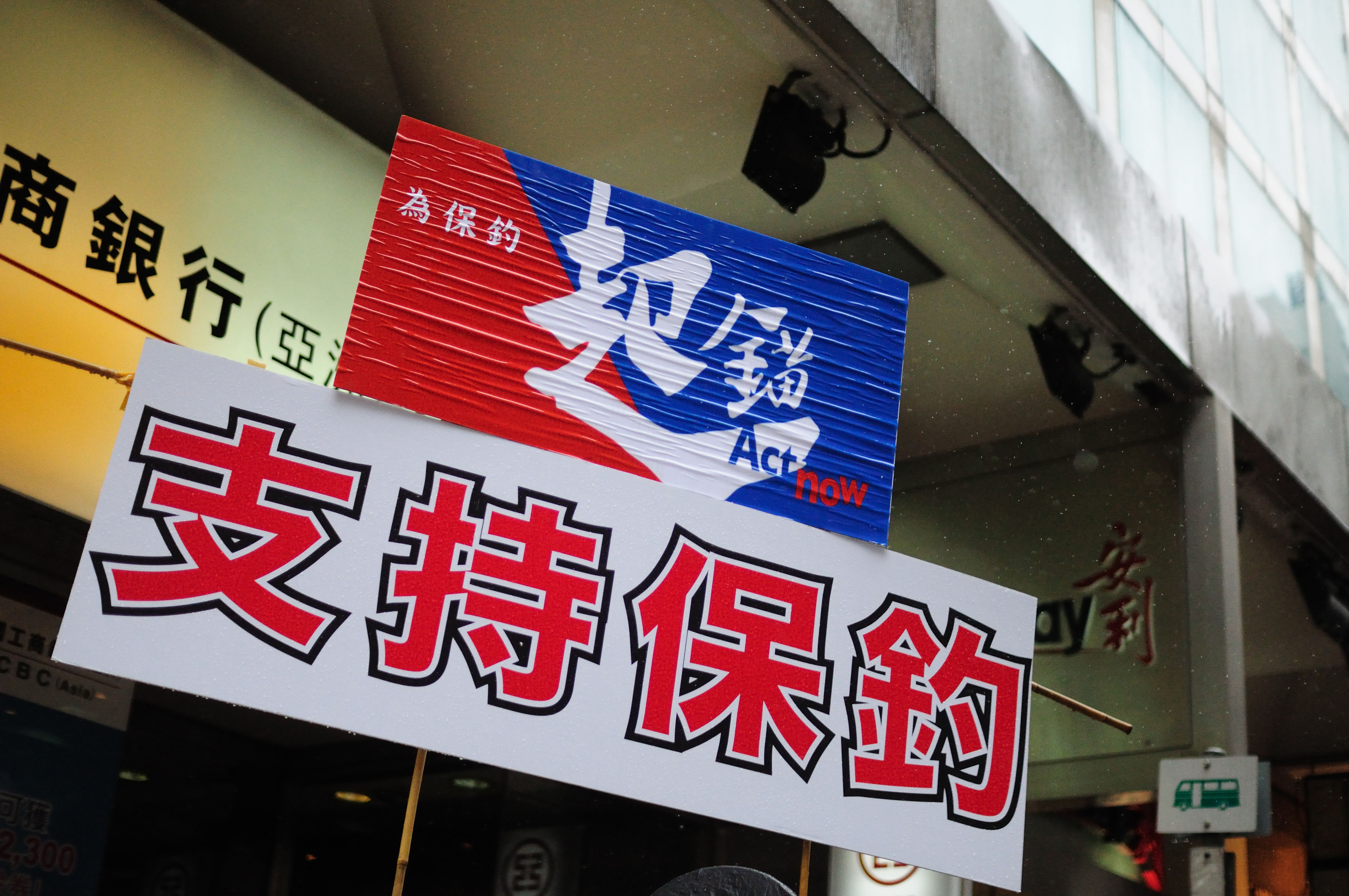
Placard written "Act now to defend the Diaoyu Islands" and "Support Baodiao"

Baodiao movement (simplified Chinese: 保钓运动; traditional Chinese: 保釣運動; lit. 'Defend the Diaoyu Islands movement') is a social movement originating among Republic of China students in the United States in the 1970s, and more recently expressed in China that asserts sovereignty over the Senkaku Islands. The territorial right to the islands is disputed among China, Taiwan, and Japan. Action Committee for Defending the Diaoyu Islands and China Federation for Defending the Diaoyu Islands are the main representative organizations in the movement.

== Political context ==
The Senkaku Islands are located northeast of Taiwan and southwest of Okinawa in the East China Sea. They are a group of uninhabited coral islets and historically, they had not been the subject of significant claims.

In the 1950s and the 1960s, the United States used them for military exercises. Oil and gas reserves were discovered beneath the islands. In 1971, the United States proposed to "return" the islands to Japan.

The islands have been claimed since the late 1960s by the Republic of China, which views them as part of the city of Toucheng in Yilan County, as well as by the People's Republic of China, which claims them as part of Taiwan province. Protests occurred in the early 1970s, particularly among ROC students in the United States, where protests were not as tightly controlled as in Taiwan. Though put on hold between 1978 and 1996 following the signing of a Chinese-Japanese diplomatic accord, the conflict was re-ignited when the "Nihon Seinensha" (Federation of Japanese Youth), a movement attached to the major Yakuza group Sumiyoshi-kai, built a lighthouse on the northernmost Senkaku island.

Administratively, they depend on the city of Ishigaki, on the island of the same name, in Okinawa Prefecture. Geographically, they are a part of the Sakishima Islands archipelago - along with the Yaeyama Islands and Miyako Islands (further to the south) - and the larger Ryukyu Islands.

The Baodiao movement developed during a shift in international relations involving the United States, the Republic of China on Taiwan, and the People's Republic of China. The Republic of China lost China's seat in the United Nations to the People's Republic of China. The United States and the People's Republic of China were taking initial steps towards the establishment of diplomatic relations.

== Movement development ==
The United States proposal to "return" the islands to Japan resulted in political disputes over issues of militarism, imperialism, and sovereignty.

The Baodiao movement began among students from Taiwan and Hong Kong studying in the United States and then spread to Taiwan and Hong Kong.

Many activists who became politicized through the Baodiao movement turned politically to the People's Republic of China (PRC). In September 1971, Kuomintang supporters in the Baodiao movement walked out of a movement conference at the University of Michigan. After the walk-out, the movement turned decisively to the political left and the pro-unification position. In summer 1971, a group of movement leaders called the Baodiao Five visited the PRC and met with Premier Zhou Enlai. Upon their return to the United States, they started tours on college campuses to promote Chinese socialism and criticize pro-Taiwan independence movements.

Baodiao movement protests ended in 1972. Many leaders of, and participants in, the movement continued to be involved in other political action related to Taiwan and PRC issues, particularly at college campuses like the University of Wisconsin.

== Events ==
- In 1972, the United States ended occupation of Okinawa and Senkaku/Diaoyu/Tiaoyutai Islands, initiating the Senkaku Islands dispute.
- In 2004, Chinese activists from the Baodiao movement landed on the islands and were arrested. Two days letter, Japanese prime minister Junichirō Koizumi demanded their return to China.
- In October 2007, Japan denounced the attempted landing of Chinese nationalist militants from the movement.
- On 10 June 2008, a Taiwanese fishing vessel and a boat from the Japan Coast Guard collided. The Taiwan Foreign Ministry recalled its representative in Tokyo to Taipei, and demanded apologies and compensation from Japan. A few days later, a nationalist boat escorted by nine Taiwanese military patrol boats came near Uotsuri-jima as a protest, before returning to Taiwan; Japan then called for both countries to "act calmly".
- On 25 September 2012, 81 Taiwanese trawlers accompanied by a dozen Taiwan Coast Guard patrol boats patrolled off the Senkaku/Diaoyu/Tiaoyutai Islands to defend the sovereignty of the Republic of China on the islands and Taiwan's fishing rights in the area. The banners of the Baodiao movement were deployed on the trawlers. A clash occurred with the Japanese coast guard, who used water cannons on the Taiwanese vessels.

== Leadership ==
One of the prominent leaders of the Movement was David Chan Yuk-cheung. He drowned in the sea near the disputed islands during the first wave of direct protests. Tens of thousands of people from Hong Kong mourned his death in Victoria Park on Hong Kong Island.

== See also ==
- 2012 anti-Japanese demonstrations in China
- Preparatory Committee for the Ryukyu Special Autonomous Region of China
