= Chink =

Racial slur against Chinese people

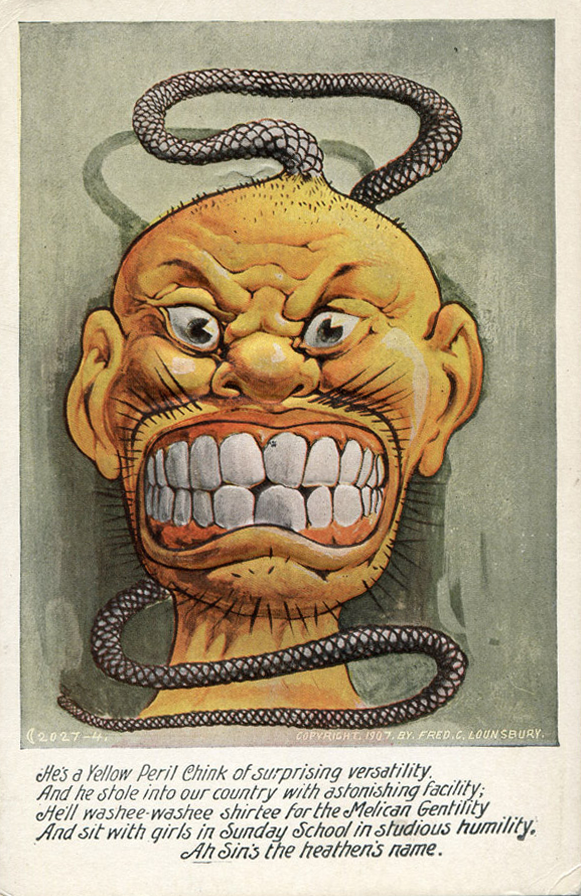
A racist postcard by Fred C. Lounsbury, promoting the idea of the Yellow Peril (1907)

Chink is an English-language ethnic slur usually referring to a person of Chinese descent, but also used to insult people with perceived East Asian features.

== Etymology ==
Various dictionaries provide different etymologies of the word chink; for example, that it originated from the Chinese courtesy ching-ching, that it evolved from the word China, or that it was an alteration of Qing (Ch'ing), as in the Qing dynasty. It may also reflect the word chink, meaning "slit," with reference to the comparatively narrow eyes of East Asians.

== History ==
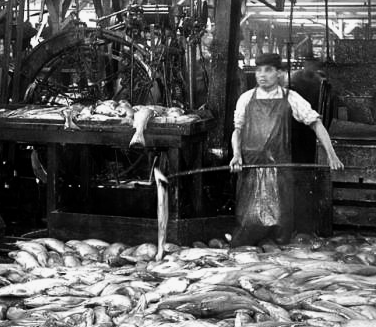
A Chinese fishplant worker standing next to the "Iron Chink", a machine that guts and cleans salmon for canning, which was marketed as a replacement for fish-butchers, who were primarily Chinese immigrants.

The first recorded use of the word chink is from approximately 1880. As far as is ascertainable, its adjective form, chinky, first appeared in print in 1878.

Around the turn of the 20th century, many white Americans in the Northern United States perceived Chinese immigration as a threat to their living standards. However, Chinese workers were still desired in the Western United States due to persistent labor shortages. Chinese immigrant workers were central to the fish canning industries on the West Coast at that time, and Chinese fish butchering crews were often known for their speed and skill. In 1905, Edmund A. Smith patented a mechanized fish-butchering machine which he named the Iron Chink. He advertised his machine being able to clean and gut a fish 55 times faster than a human worker, promising it would, "easily perform the work of many Chinamen." The machine's name is seen by historians as symbolic of the widespread anti-Chinese racism during the era.

Usage of the word continued, such as with the 1916 story "The Chink and the Child," from Limehouse Nights by Thomas Burke, which was adapted to film three years later by D. W. Griffith under the title Broken Blossoms.

Although chink usually refers to those appearing to be of Chinese descent, the term has also been directed towards people of other East and Southeast Asian ethnicities. Literature and film about the Vietnam war contain examples of this usage, including the film Platoon (1986) and the play Sticks and Bones (1971, also later filmed).

== Worldwide usage ==
=== Australia ===
The terms Chinaman and chink became intertwined, as some Australians used both with hostile intent when referring to members of the country's Chinese population, which had swelled significantly during the Gold Rush era of the 1850s and 1860s.

Assaults on Chinese miners and racially motivated riots and public disturbances were not infrequent occurrences in Australia's mining districts in the second half of the 19th century. There was some resentment, too, of the fact that Chinese miners and laborers tended to send their earnings back home to their families in China rather than spending them in Australia and supporting the local economy.

In the popular Sydney Bulletin magazine in 1887, one author wrote: "No nigger, no chink, no lascar, no kanaka (laborer from the South Pacific islands), no purveyor of cheap labour, is an Australian." Eventually, since-repealed federal government legislation was passed to restrict non-white immigration and thus protect the jobs of Anglo-Celtic Australian workers from "undesirable" competition.

=== India ===
In India, the ethnic slur chinki (or chinky) is frequently directed against people with East Asian features, including people from Northeast India, who are often mistaken for Chinese, despite being closer to Tibetans and the Burmese than to Han Chinese peoples.

In 2012, the Indian Ministry of Home Affairs recognized use of the term "chinki" to refer to a member of the Scheduled Tribes (especially in the North-East) as a criminal offense under the Scheduled Castes and Scheduled Tribes (Prevention of Atrocities) Act with a penalty of up to five years in jail. The Ministry further warned that they would very seriously review any failure of the police to enforce this interpretation of the Act.

=== United Kingdom ===
Chinky: Strongest language, highly unacceptable without strong contextualisation. Seen as derogatory to Chinese people. More mixed views regarding use of the term to mean 'Chinese takeaway.'

— Broadcasting regulator Ofcom, Attitudes to potentially offensive language and gestures on TV and radio (2016)

Chinky (or chinky chonky) is slang for a Chinese takeaway restaurant or Chinese food and Chinese people which, in parts of northern England, are known as a chinkies, always in the plural.

The 1969 top 3 UK hit single for Blue Mink, "Melting Pot," has the lyric: "take a pinch of white man/Wrap him up in black skin. [...] Mixed with yellow Chinkies. You know you lump it all together/And you got a recipe for a get-along scene/Oh what a beautiful dream/If it could only come true." In August 2019, British broadcaster Global permanently deleted the song from its Gold playlist after a complaint about offensive language was lodged with British broadcasting regulator Ofcom. Under the direction of the Communications Act 2003, Ofcom ruled that "the phrase 'yellow Chinkies' had the potential to be highly offensive" and "that the use of derogatory language to describe ethnic groups carries a widespread potential for offence." Ofcom considered that the passage of time since the song's release and the song's positive message of racial harmony did not "mitigate the potential for offence." Ofcom determined that the "potentially offensive material was not justified by the context" and ruled the case resolved as the licensee Global had removed the song from Gold's playlist. In September 2019, Scottish community radio station Black Diamond FM removed "Melting Pot" from its playlist and "planned to carry out refresher training with its staff" after two complaints about the song's broadcast were lodged with Ofcom. Ofcom ruled in December 2019 that Black Diamond was in breach of Ofcom's Broadcasting Code because "the potentially offensive language in this broadcast was not justified by the context."

In 1999, an exam given to students in Scotland was criticized for containing a passage that students were told to interpret containing the word chinky. This exam was taken by students all over Scotland, and Chinese groups expressed offence at the use of this passage. The examinations body apologized, calling the passage's inclusion "an error of judgement."

In 2002, the Broadcasting Standards Commission, after a complaint about the BBC One programme The Vicar of Dibley, held that when used as the name of a type of restaurant or meal, rather than as an adjective applied to a person or group of people, the word still carries extreme racist connotation which causes offence particularly to those of East Asian origin.

In 2004, the commission's counterpart, the Radio Authority, apologised for the offence caused by an incident where a DJ on Heart 106.2 used the term.

In a 2005 document commissioned by Ofcom titled "Language and Sexual Imagery in Broadcasting: A Contextual Investigation" their definition of chink was "a term of racial offence/abuse. However, this is polarising. Older and mainly white groups tend to think this is not usually used in an abusive way—e.g., let's go to the Chinky—which is not seen as offensive by those who aren't of East Asian origin; Chinky usually refers to food not a culture or race however, younger people, East Asians, particularly people of Chinese origin and other non-white ethnic minorities believe the word 'Chinky, Chinkies or Chinkie' to be as insulting as 'paki' or 'nigger'."

In 2006, after several campaigns by the Scottish Executive, more people in Scotland now acknowledge that this name is indirectly racist. As of 2016, British broadcasting regulator Ofcom considers the word to be "Strongest language, highly unacceptable without strong contextualisation. Seen as derogatory to Chinese people. More mixed views regarding use of the term to mean 'Chinese takeaway.'"

In 2014, the term gained renewed attention after a recording emerged of UKIP candidate Kerry Smith referring to a woman of Chinese background as a "chinky bird."

=== United States ===
The Pekin Community High School District 303 teams in Pekin, Illinois were officially known as the "Pekin Chinks" until 1981, when the school administration changed the name to the "Pekin Dragons." The event received national attention.

During early 2000, University of California, Davis experienced a string of racial incidents and crimes between Asian and white students, mostly among fraternities. Several incidents included "chink" and other racial epithets being shouted among groups, including the slurs being used during a robbery and assault on an Asian fraternity by 15 white males. The incidents motivated a school-wide review and protest to get professional conflict resolution and culturally sensitive mediators.

Sarah Silverman appeared on Late Night with Conan O'Brien in 2001, stirring up controversy when the word chink was used without the usual bleep appearing over ethnic slurs on network television. The controversy led Asian activist and community leader Guy Aoki to appear on the talk show Politically Incorrect along with Sarah Silverman. Guy Aoki alleged that Silverman did not believe that the term was offensive.

New York City radio station Hot 97 was criticized for airing the "Tsunami Song." Referring to the 2004 Indian Ocean earthquake, in which over an estimated 200,000 people died, the song used the phrase "screaming chinks" along with other offensive lyrics. The radio station fired a co-host and producer, and indefinitely suspended radio personality Miss Jones, who was later reinstated. Members of the Asian American community said Miss Jones' reinstatement condoned hate speech.

A Philadelphia eatery, Chink's Steaks, created controversy beginning in 2004 with articles appearing in the Philadelphia Daily News and other newspapers. The restaurant was asked by Asian community groups to change the name. The restaurant was named after the original Jewish-American owner's nickname, "Chink," derived from the ethnic slur due to his "slanty eyes." The restaurant was renamed Joe's in 2013.

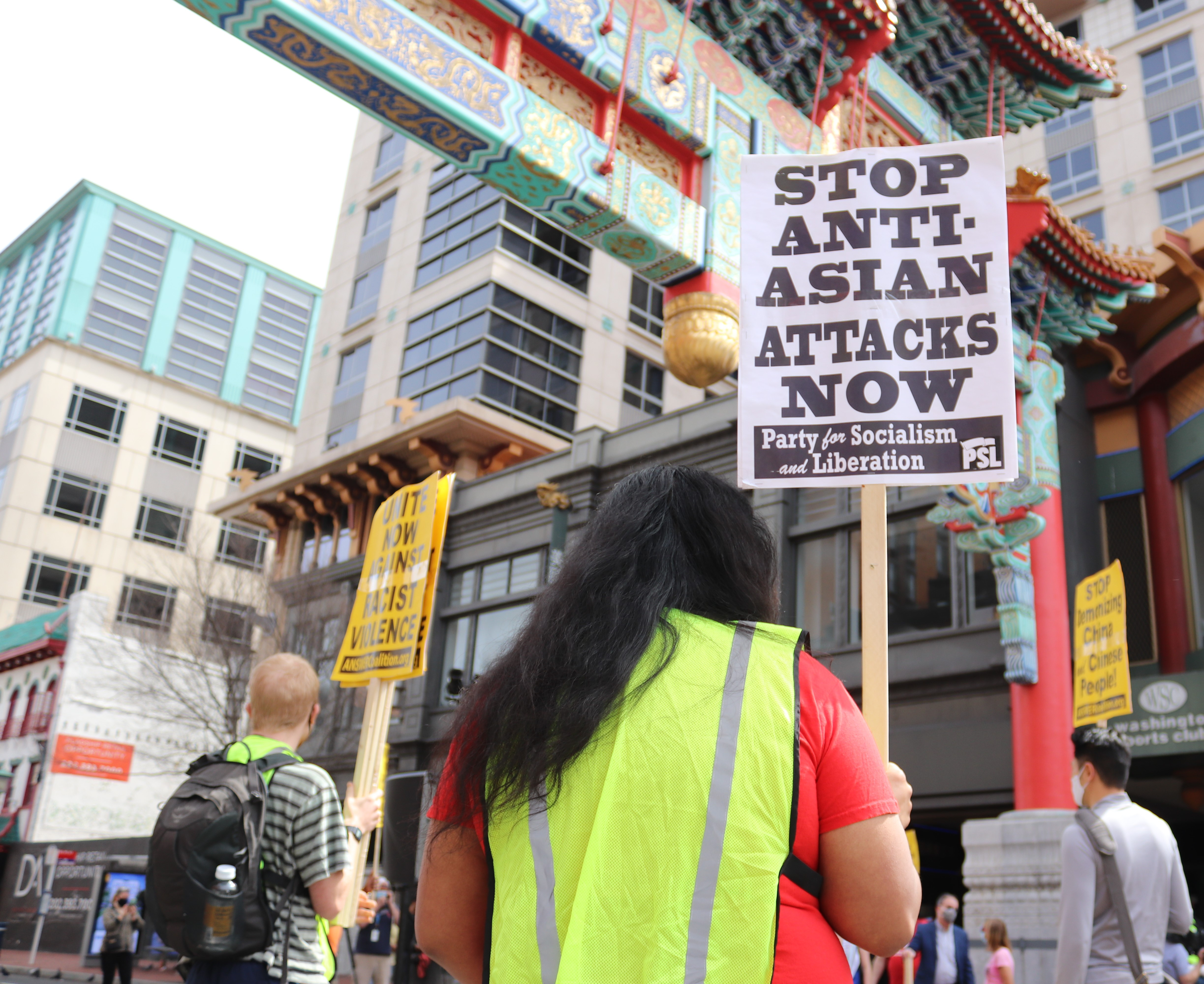
Stop Asian Hate emerged as a response to the use of slurs such as 'Chink' in the aftermath of the COVID-19 pandemic.

In February 2012, ESPN fired one employee and suspended another for using the headline "Chink in the Armor" in reference to Jeremy Lin, an American basketball player of Taiwanese and Chinese descent. While the word chink also refers to a crack or fissure and chink in the armor is an idiom and common sports cliché, referring to a vulnerability, the "apparently intentional" double entendre of its use in reference to an Asian athlete was viewed as offensive.

In September 2019, after it was announced that Shane Gillis would be joining Saturday Night Live as a featured cast member, clips from Gillis' podcast in 2018 resurfaced, in which Gillis made anti-Asian jokes, including using the word "chink." The revelation sparked public outcry, with several outlets noting the disconnect of hiring Gillis along with Bowen Yang, the show's first Chinese American cast member. After Gillis issued what was characterized as a non-apology apology, a spokesperson for Lorne Michaels announced Gillis would be let go prior to his first episode due to the controversy.

In May 2021, American comedian Tony Hinchcliffe was videotaped insulting Peng Dang, an Asian American comedian who had introduced Hinchcliffe after performing the previous set at a comedy club in Austin, Texas, by referring to Dang as a "filthy little fucking chink." Dang posted the video on Twitter, resulting in heavy backlash against Hinchliffe, who was subsequently dropped by his agency and removed from several scheduled shows.

In July 2025, the Love Island USA season 7 contestant, Cierra Ortega, was removed from the show one week before the season finale after social media posts from years prior resurfaced of her using the term. After her removal, she finally spoke out on Instagram on the matter, "I am deeply, truly, honestly, so sorry. I had no idea that the word held as much pain as much harm, and came with the history that it did, or I never would have used it," she said. "I had no ill intention when I was using it. But that's absolutely no excuse, because intent doesn't excuse ignorance." There were two posts that resurfaced on social media of Ortega using the term—one from 2015 and another from 2023—both of which show Ortega using the term to describe her own appearance. Viewers and fans of the show quickly began asking Peacock to remove Ortega from the show, including over 17,000 people signing an online petition.

== See also ==
- Ang moh
- Chinaman
- Ching chong
- Coolie
- Gook
- Guling (derogatory)
- Gweilo
- Jap
- Moke (slang)
- Shina (word)
- List of ethnic slurs

== Sources ==
- Foster, Harry. A Beachcomber in the Orient. New York: Dodd, Mead & Co., 1930.
