= Jjokbari =

Korean language anti-Japanese slur

Korean name
- Hangul: 쪽발이 / 쪽바리
Transcriptions
- Revised Romanization: Jjokbari
- McCune–Reischauer: Tchokpari

Japanese name
- Katakana: チョッパリ
Transcriptions
- Romanization: Choppari

Jjokbari (Korean: 쪽발이, borrowed into Japanese as choppari (チョッパリ)) is a Korean language ethnic slur which may refer to Japanese citizens or people of Japanese ancestry. A variation on the slur, ban-jjokbari, meaning literally "half-jjokbari", has been used to refer to mixed Japanese-Korean people, as well as Koreans in Japan who returned to the peninsula.

According to one survey, it was South Korea's second-most commonly used slur against Japanese people, ahead of wae-nom (왜놈; 倭놈; lit. 'Wae bastards') and behind ilbon-nom (일본놈; 日本놈; lit. 'Japanese bastards').

The term has also been borrowed into Japanese language spoken by ethnic Koreans in Japan, where it is rendered Choppari.

== Origin ==
『Dictionnaire coréen-français』1880

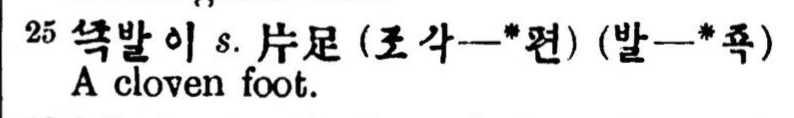
『Korean English dictionary』1897

The original meaning is "A cloven foot". Jjok means a "piece" and bal means "feet" in Korean, and when combined it roughly translates to "split feet" or "cloven hoof". This etymology refers to the fact that the Japanese wore geta, a traditional Japanese wooden sandal, which separates the big toe from the others.

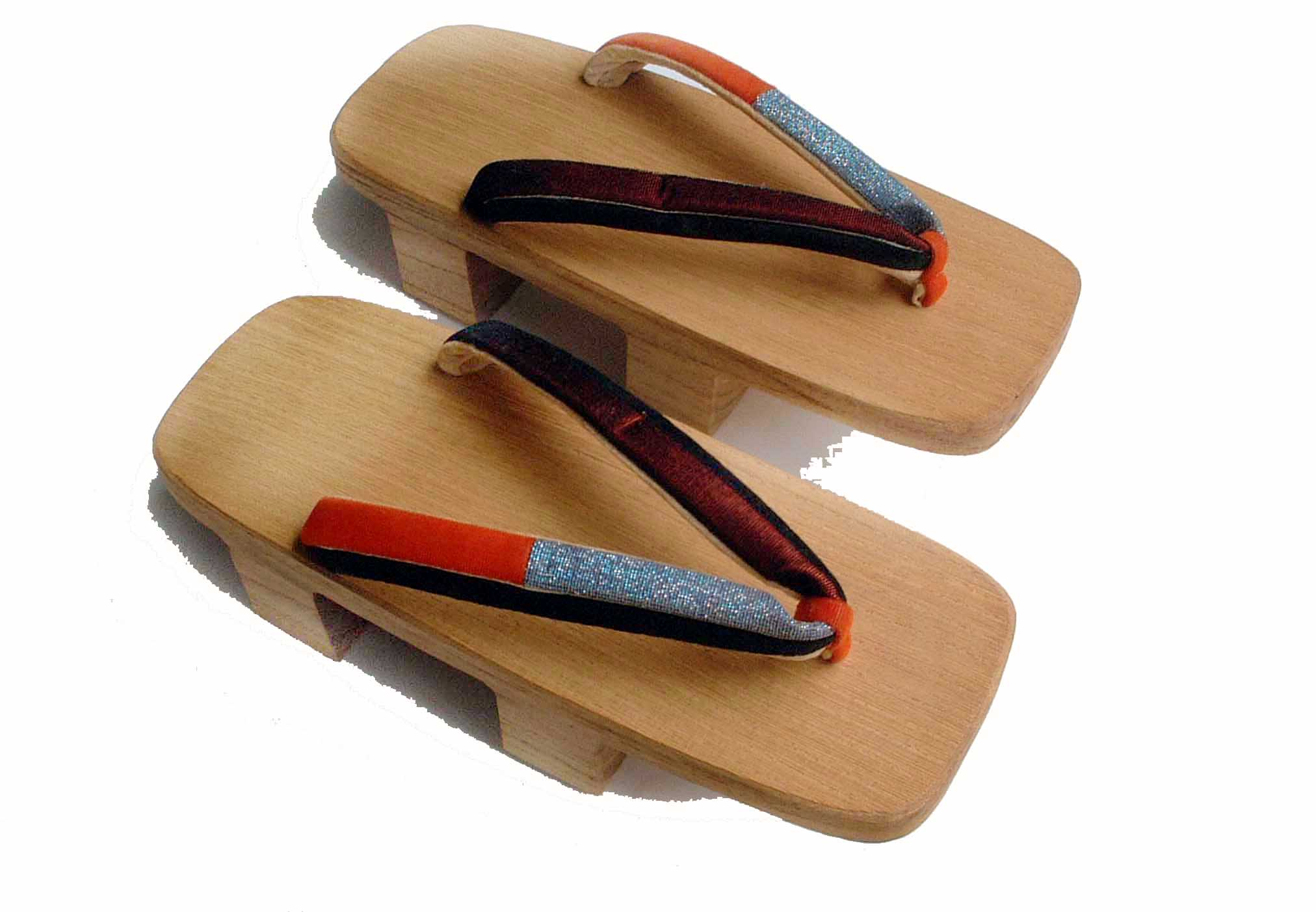
A pair of Japanese traditional footwear, geta. Unlike traditional Korean footwear, geta separate the big toe from the other four toes.

Unlike Korean-style straw shoes which completely cover the foot, Japanese-style straw shoes and wooden geta consist of only a sole and straps to bind it to the sole of the foot. This leaves the rest of the foot exposed, including the "split" between the toes. Koreans thought of Japanese shoes as incomplete compared to their own, and the visible split as a distinctive enough trait to inspire an ethnic slur.

== Ban-jjokbari ==
The form ban-jjokbari (literally, "half jjokbari") originated as a derogatory reference to Japanized Koreans during the Japanese colonial period in Korea; later, it came to be used to refer to Japanese with Korean ancestry, as well as Koreans in Japan who returned to the peninsula in both North and South Korea.

The Japanized pronunciation of this form, ban-choppari, is also widely used by Koreans in Japan in a similar manner.

== See also ==
- Anti-Japanese sentiment
- Anti-Japanese sentiment in Korea
- Guizi (Chinese)
- Jap (English)
- Xiao Riben (Chinese)
- Zainichi Korean language
