= David Chan Yuk-cheung =

Chinese activist and politician (1950–1996)

- Born: 14 October 1950; Chaoyang, Guangdong
- Died: 26 September 1996 (aged 45); Senkaku Islands, Ishigaki, Okinawa, Japan

David Chan Yuk-cheung (Chinese: 陳毓祥; 14 October 1950 – 26 September 1996) was born in Chaoyang, Guangdong, China. He was a prominent leader of the Baodiao movement in Hong Kong, which advocates Chinese sovereignty over the Senkaku Islands in the Senkaku Islands dispute between China and Japan.

== Biography ==
Being a high school graduate from King's College, Hong Kong, David Chan Yuk-cheung obtained a bachelor's degree from the University of Hong Kong and a master's degree from the Chinese University of Hong Kong.

He began participating in the Baodiao movement in 1970. He joined the protest staged by university students at the Victoria Park in 1971 when he was a secondary school student. When he studied in the University of Hong Kong, he served as chairman for the Movement for Defending Diaoyu Islands, an active subgroup of the Hong Kong Federation of Students. After graduation, he worked for the Hong Kong government's radio and TV station RTHK and the Cantonese broadcasting section of the BBC. He was amongst the first generation of hosts for Phone-in programs, and acquired notable fame as a TV presenter in Hong Kong. He was selected as one of Hong Kong's Ten Outstanding Young Persons by Junior Chamber International Hong Kong (JCIHK) in 1985.

== Political life ==
Chan was an independent candidate in the 1991 Hong Kong Legislative Council election for the Hong Kong Island West Constituency. He gained 29,413 votes. In 1995, he ran again in the Legislative Council election and gained 10,514 votes in the Financing, Insurance, Real Estate and Business Services constituency. He lost both elections.

== Death ==
On 26 September 1996, activists on board the ship Baodiao arrived in the waters around the Senkaku Islands. Chan Yuk-cheung, along with 5 fellow activists, jumped into the sea and swam to the island wearing life jackets. While swimming, Chan's feet were caught by wires and his head was injured. He passed out in the water and remained upside down for several minutes, possibly suffering from asphyxiation. The Japanese Maritime Safety Agency assisted in the rescue effort, but were unable to revive him, and he died. When his coffin arrived at the Hong Kong Kai Tak Airport, it was covered with the Chinese national flag.

=== Aftermath ===
His death was mourned by tens of thousands of people in Victoria Park, Hong Kong. On 6 October 1996, the memorial service for "Chan Yuk-cheung, hero for defending the Diaoyu Islands" was held in Hong Kong; more than 2,000 people including officials from mainland China and Hong Kong had attended the service.

Chan's death greatly influenced the unification of the different factions within the Baodiao movement.

On 22 October 2006, activists of the Action Committee for Defending the Diaoyu Islands from Hong Kong, Macau, and Taiwan attempted to approach the islands on board the fishing boat Baodiao II, in memory of Chan Yuk-cheung on the 10th anniversary of his death. They were turned away from the islands by Japanese Coast Guard boats, but paid a public tribute to Chen Yuk-cheung at a position ten nautical miles from the islands.

== Books ==
Chan wrote a number of books on Hong Kong society and politics during his lifetime.

== Family ==
Chan's elder daughter, Chan On Yin, is a theater actress who graduated from the Hong Kong Academy for Performing Arts. His younger son, Brian, is an actor and host on Hong Kong's Now TV and ViuTV (both are owned by PCCW, via its subsidiaries).

== See also ==
- China Federation for Defending the Diaoyu Islands
- List of drowning victims
- List of Hong Kong people
