= Guling (derogatory) =

Ethnic slur

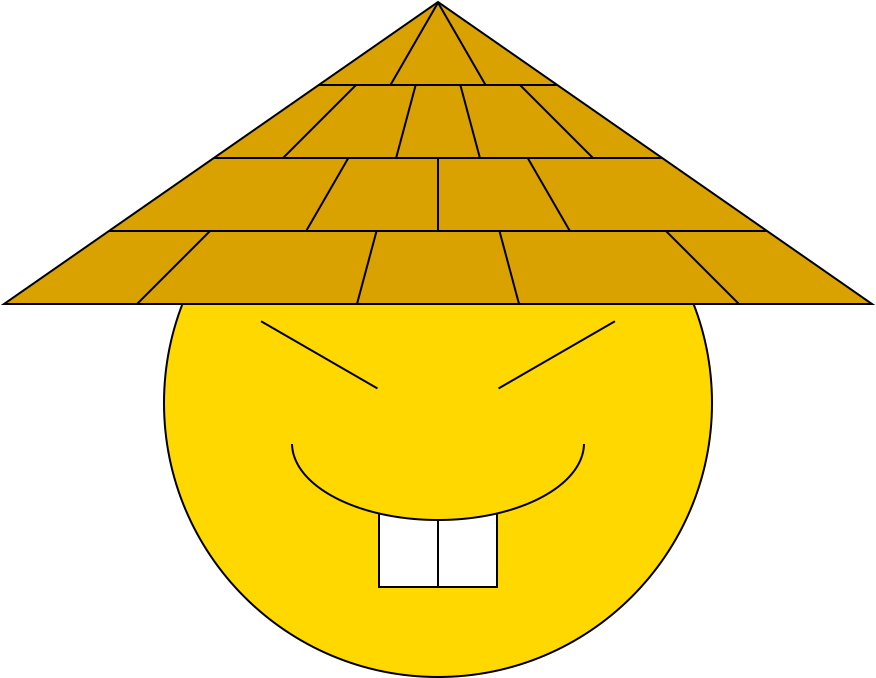
Classic petty racist kids-caricature of a "guling", featuring yellow skin, slanted eyes, buck teeth, and an Asian conical hat

Guling (lit. 'yellowling', sometimes pronounced /yulling/) is a derogatory term for East Asians and Southeast Asians.

The concept has its roots in antiquated race science, where Asians were assigned "yellow" skin and were referred to as the yellow race (compare the red race for Indians). The association was spread, among other things, by the notion that Asians threatened to outcompete the Western world, in a phenomenon known as the "Yellow Peril". The coolies, who were considered industrious, disciplined, and well-organized, and who could displace white workers, were part of this argument.

Racist caricatures of "gulingar" are usually given yellow skin, slanted eyes, buck teeth, and an Asian conical hat, sometimes even a "Chinese mustache" (Fu Manchu moustache). Buck teeth as a caricature element dates back to at least World War II and were used in American propaganda to make Japanese people appear unrefined in order to undermine the intelligence of the "Japanese race".

== See also ==
- Ang mo
- Chinaman
- Ching chong
- Chink
- Coolie
- Gook
- Gweilo
- Jap
- Moke (slang)
- Shina (word)
