= Nip =

Offensive term for Japanese person

Usage of the term Nips in the 1944 American cartoon Bugs Bunny Nips the Nips

Nip is an ethnic slur against people of Japanese descent and origin. The word Nip is an abbreviation from Nippon (日本), the Japanese name for Japan.

== History ==
The earliest recorded occurrence of the slur was in the issue of Time magazine published on 5 January 1942, in which "three Nip pilots" were mentioned. The outbreak of the Pacific War in 1941 led to an increase in the usage of anti-Japanese slurs such as Jap and Nip among English-speaking Allied troops. The word was most frequently used among American, British and Australian servicemen to refer to Japanese military personnel. The official Royal Air Force journal of 1942 made numerous references to the Japanese as Nips, even making puns such as "there's a nip in the air". This phrase was later re-used for Hirohito's visit to the UK in 1971 by the satirical magazine Private Eye.

As part of American wartime propaganda, caricatures and slurs (including Nip) against the Japanese diffused into entertainment, such as exemplified by the Warner Bros. cartoon Bugs Bunny Nips the Nips (1944). In General Kenney Reports: A Personal History of the Pacific War (1949), George Kenney made racial statements about the Japanese, remarking for example that "Nips are just vermin to be exterminated".

In a manner to evoke further anti-Japanese agitation, a Seattle Star editorial titled "It's Time to do Some Thinking On Nips' Return" from December 14, 1944, discussed the citizenship rights of Japanese-Americans and framed their return to American society as a problem. On November 16, 2018, the abbreviation for the Conference on Neural Information Processing Systems was changed from NIPS to NeurIPS, both because of the slur and because people made sexist jokes related to nipples.

== See also ==
- Jap
