= Joe's Steaks + Soda Shop =

Coordinates: 40.018443°N 75.058081°W

Joe's Steaks

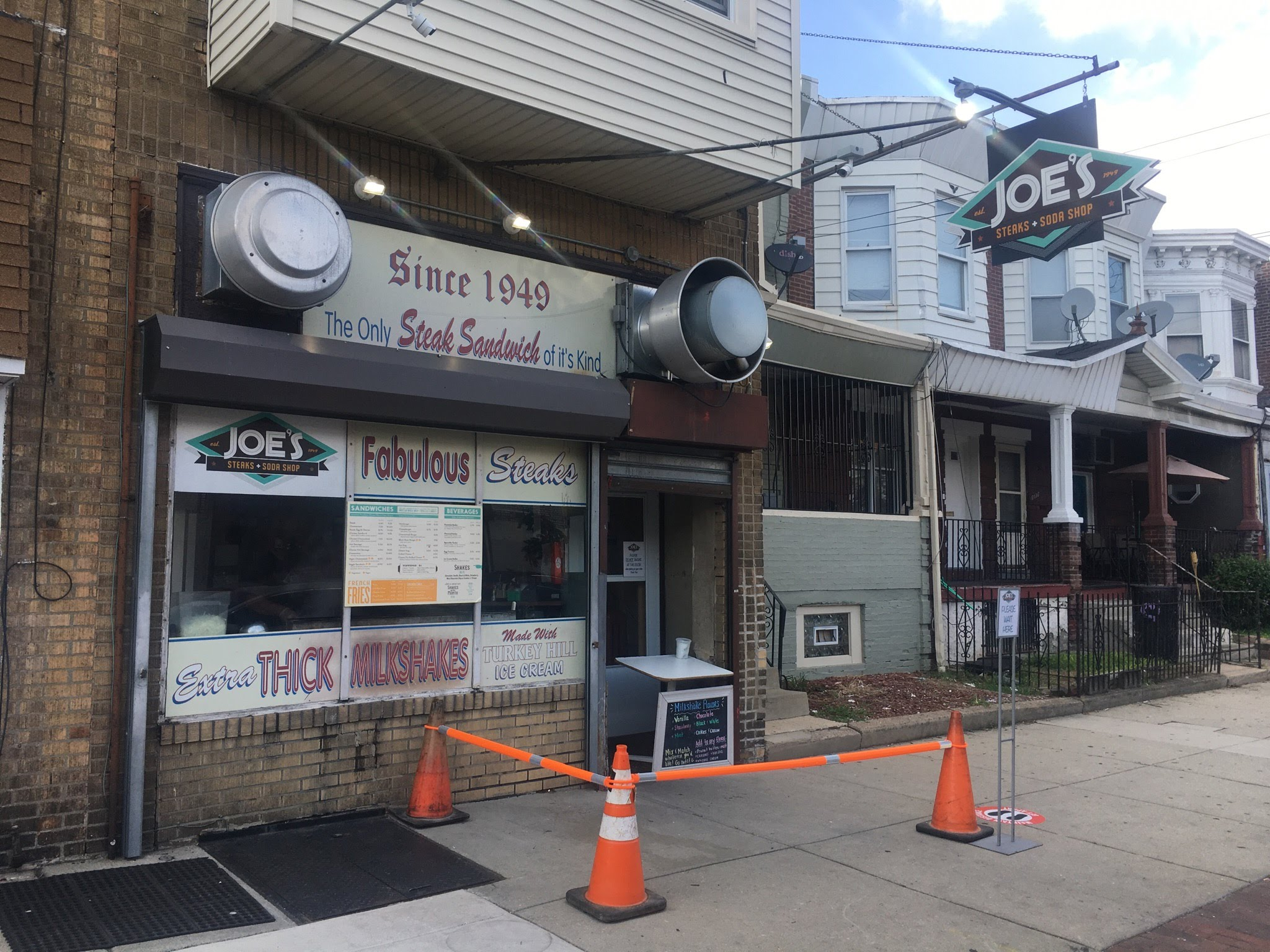
- Front entrance to Joe's Steak on Torresdale
- Interactive map of Joe's Steaks

Restaurant information
- Established: 1949; 77 years ago
- Owner: Joe Groh
- Previous owner: Samuel Sherman
- Food type: Cheesesteaks and other sandwiches
- Dress code: Casual
- Location: 6030 Torresdale Avenue (flagship location), Philadelphia, United States, Pennsylvania, 19135
- Other locations: 1 W Girard Avenue, Philadelphia, PA 19123
- Website: joessteaks.com

Joe's Steaks + Soda Shop, formerly named Chink's Steaks, was a cheesesteak restaurant founded in 1949 in Northeast Philadelphia, Pennsylvania. Controversy over the restaurant's former name led to the owner renaming it. A second restaurant location opened in the Fishtown neighborhood of Philadelphia in 2015. In addition to its cheesesteak sandwich specialty, the company sold other types of sandwiches, hamburgers, hot dogs, sausages, and other foods. The original location closed in early 2023.

== History ==
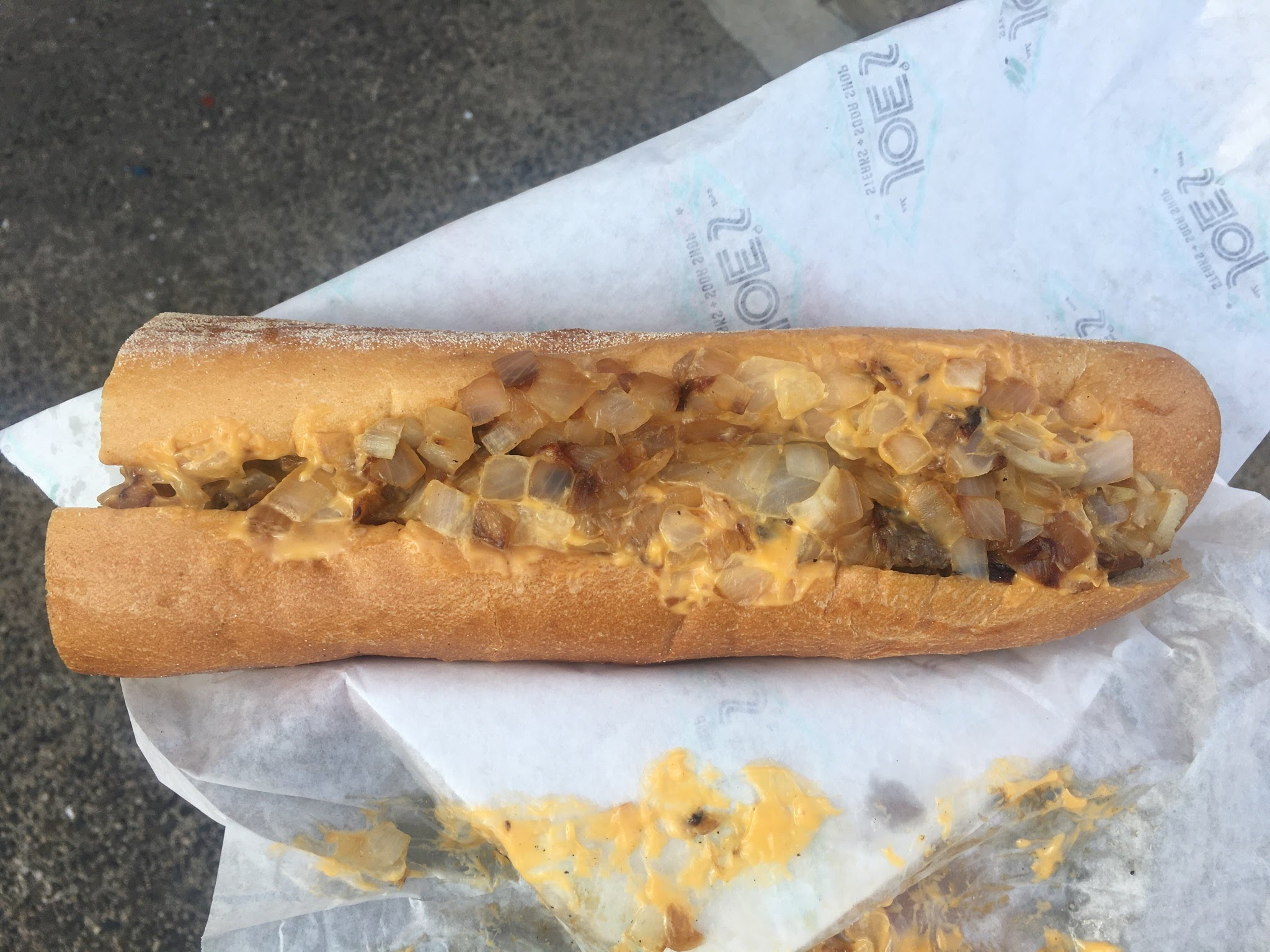
Cheesesteak with Whiz and fried onions from Joe's

In 1949, Samuel "Chink" Sherman opened Chink's Steaks. Sherman, who was Jewish, was nicknamed "chink", an ethnic slur commonly used at the time, because his eyes were almond-shaped, considered to be a Chinese characteristic. Sherman died in 1997. In 1999, longtime employee Joe Groh, purchased the restaurant from Sherman's family.

In 2013, Groh changed the name of the restaurant to Joe's Steaks due to criticism of the use of "chink", a word that had come to be considered unacceptable. Groh did not change the name earlier because he wanted to "honor the wishes of some of the regular customers who were opposed to any kind of change, big or small", and because the name was a tradition. Some of the restaurant's customers from the neighborhood opposed the name change, and some badgered Joe about the matter. Some people also left negative comments about the name change on various social media websites and on online restaurant review sites. The restaurant suffered a loss of profit after some customers boycotted it due to the name change.

Groh expanded to a second location in Fishtown which opened on April 1, 2015.

== Fare and atmosphere ==
Joe's Steaks specializes in cheesesteak sandwiches, and also serves other types of sandwiches, hamburgers, hot dogs and sausages, hand-cut fries, sodas, milkshakes and sundaes. The company also purveys a vegan cheesesteak sandwich. The original location on Torresdale Avenue has a 1950s diner style, with wooden booths that have small jukeboxes (which are no longer operational), a lunch counter and soda fountain. It has seating for about thirty customers. The Fishtown neighborhood location is larger.

== Reception ==
Erin O'Neill of NJ.com rated Joe's Steaks as "10 Philly cheesesteaks worth crossing the bridge for".

== See also ==
- List of submarine sandwich restaurants
