= Chink in one's armor =

Idiom referring to an area of vulnerability

The idiom "chink in one's armor" refers to an area of vulnerability. It has traditionally been used to refer to a weak spot in a figurative suit of armor. The standard meaning is similar to that of Achilles' heel.

Grammarians provide a sample usage by The Daily Telegraph that they find acceptable: "Such hype was anathema for the modest professional fighter, who has 22 victories under his belt, and not a perceptible chink in his armour."

== Etymology ==
The phrase "chink in one's armor" has been used idiomatically since the mid-17th century. It is based on a definition of chink meaning "a crack or gap," dating back to around 1400.

== Notable controversies ==
ESPN posted a headline using the text "Chink in the Armor" but quickly retracted it.

While the phrase itself is innocuous, its use in contemporary times has caused controversy in the United States due to it including the homonym "chink", which can be interpreted as an ethnic slur to refer to someone of Chinese or East Asian descent.

=== ESPN ===
Considerable controversy was generated in the United States after two incidents regarding Taiwanese American basketball player Jeremy Lin and the network ESPN occurred in the same week.

An editor used the phrase as a headline on the company's web site in February 2012; the headline was titled "Chink in the Armor", and referred specifically to Lin. The headline was a reference to Lin's unsuccessful game against the New Orleans Hornets, suggesting that Jeremy Lin's popularity and winning streak were weakening. While ESPN has used the phrase "chink in the armor" on its website over 3,000 times before, its usage in this instance was considered offensive because it directly referred to a person of Asian descent. Many viewed the usage of the phrase as a double entendre. ESPN quickly removed the headline, apologized, and said it was conducting an internal review. The editor, Anthony Federico, denied any idiomatic usage, saying "This had nothing to do with me being cute or punny ... I'm so sorry that I offended people. I'm so sorry if I offended Jeremy." Federico was fired and later became a Catholic priest as a result of the incident.

On-air ESPN commentator Max Bretos also used the same phrase to refer to Lin, asking "If there is a chink in the armor, where can Lin improve his game?" Bretos apologized, saying "My wife is Asian, would never intentionally say anything to disrespect her and that community." He was later suspended from his position for a month. Forbes believes he did so without racist intent.

Comedy television show Saturday Night Live satirized ESPN's use of the phrase, pointing out the difference in society's reaction to racial jokes about Asian people versus racial jokes about black people. In the skit, three sports commentators were featured happily making jokes about Lin's race, while a fourth drew contempt for making similar comments about black players.

=== Other ===
A commentator on CNBC in 2013 used the phrase when referring to Rupert Murdoch's divorce of his Asian-American wife, sparking outrage. In 2015, The Wall Street Journal used the idiom in a tweet to promote an article about various difficulties China's paramount leader Xi Jinping was encountering. The organization subsequently deleted the post, stating that "a common idiom used might be seen as a slur. No offense was intended."

In October 2018, TBS baseball announcer Ron Darling, who himself is of Chinese descent, used the phrase during a Yankees-Red Sox playoff game, referring to the performance of Japanese pitcher Masahiro Tanaka and immediately received similar criticism. Darling later apologized for his unintentional choice of words.
