= 2012 anti-Japanese demonstrations in China =

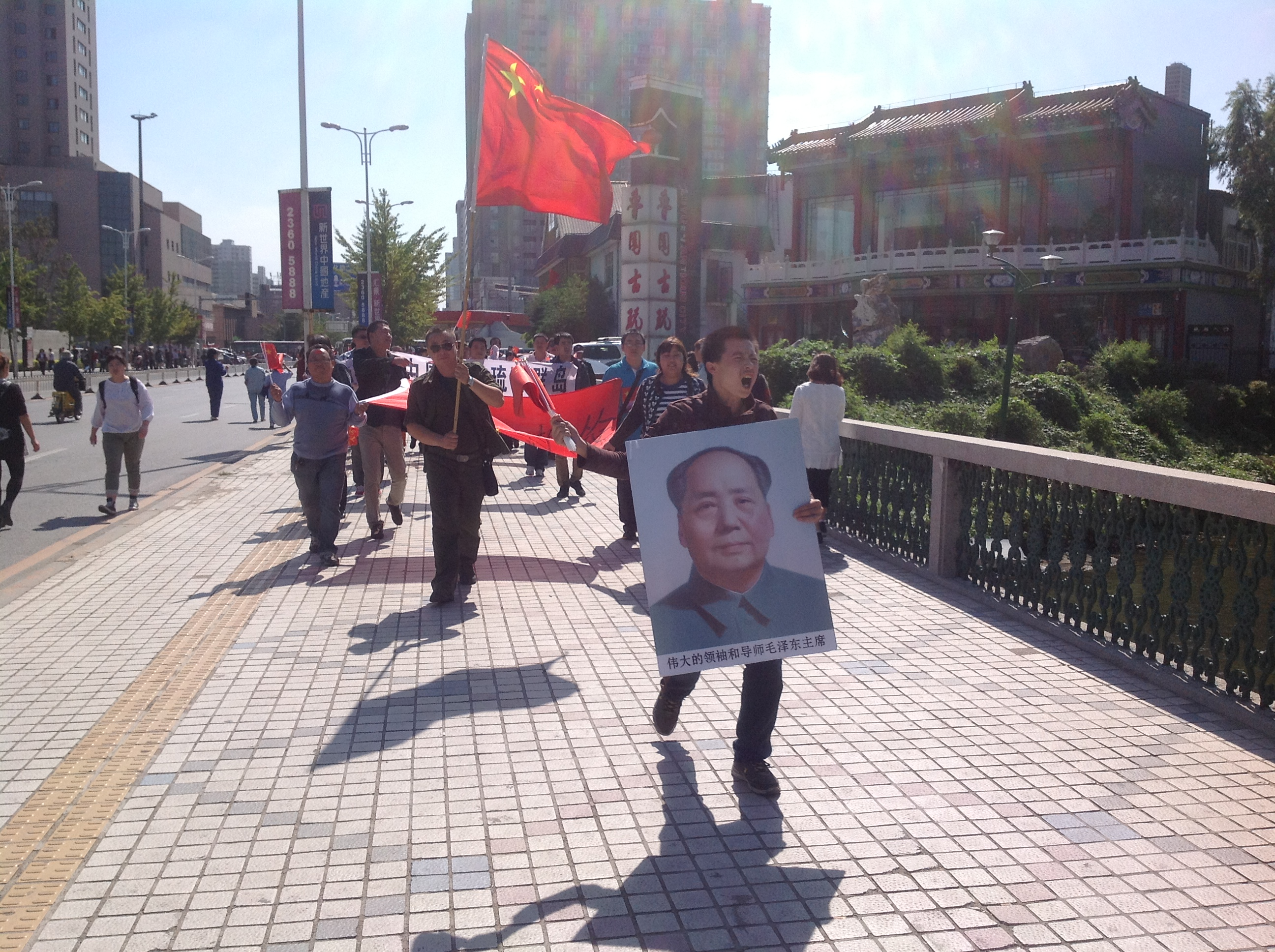
Anti-Japanese protesters hoisted the portrait of Mao Zedong in Shenyang on 18 September 2012.

From August to September 2012, a series of anti-Japanese demonstrations were held across more than 100 cities in the People's Republic of China. The main cause of the demonstrations was the escalation of the Senkaku Islands dispute between China and Japan around the time of the anniversary of the Mukden Incident of 1931, which was the de facto catalyst to the Japanese invasion of Manchuria, culminating in a decisive Japanese victory vis-à-vis total consolidation and annexation of Manchuria. Protesters in several cities later became violent and local authorities began arresting demonstrators and banning the demonstrations.

== Background ==
The Senkaku Islands (Diaoyu Islands) are offshore islands near Taiwan, and have been a subject of territorial dispute between the governments of China, Taiwan and Japan. Prior to the demonstrations, there were many cases of protests over the sovereignty of the islands, most notably those in China in 2005. September 18 marks the anniversary of the 1931 Japanese invasion of Manchuria, the memories of which fuel anti-Japanese sentiment in China.

After the 2010 Senkaku boat collision incident, China stopped exporting rare earths to Japan.

=== Incidents leading up to the protests ===
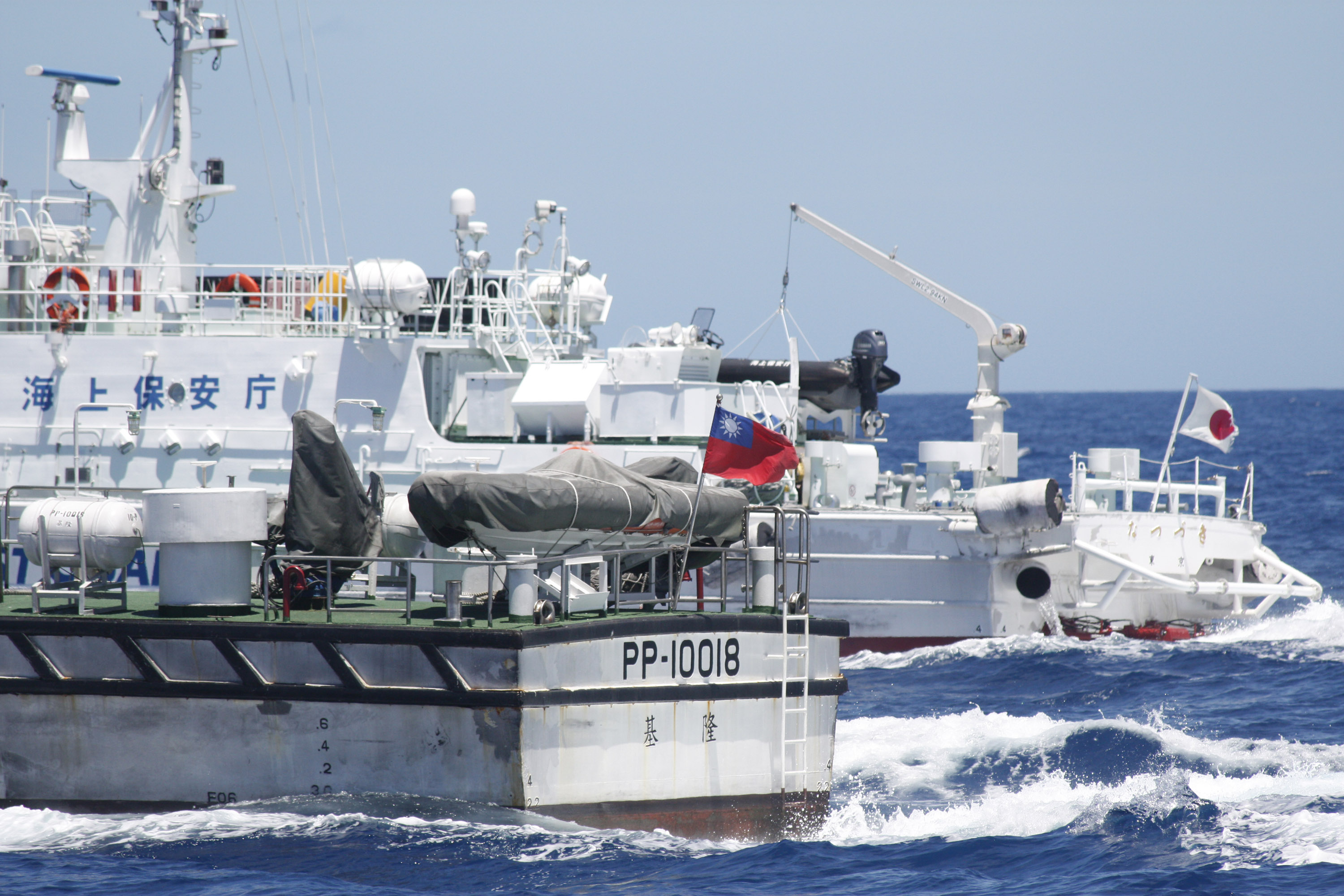
Japanese and Taiwanese coast guards stood face to face on July 4, 2012.

On 16 April 2012, Tokyo's prefectural governor Shintaro Ishihara publicly announced his decision to let Tokyo Municipality purchase the island from its private owner.

On 4 July 2012, three Japanese coast guard boats made an official inspection of a Taiwanese ship near the disputed island. After the inspection, the Japanese and Taiwanese coast guards stood face to face.

On 7 July 2012, Japanese prime minister Yoshihiko Noda expressed his consideration for the Japanese government to buy the disputed islands. The Chinese government angrily protested; Ministry spokesman Liu Weimin retorted "No one will ever be permitted to buy and sell China's sacred territory".

On 15 August 2012, activists from Hong Kong sailed to, and landed on one of the disputed islands, but were stopped by the Japan Coast Guard. Seven activists jumped from the ships to swim ashore, five of whom reached the island; the other two turned back to the ships. The activists and their ship were detained by Japanese authorities. The detained activists were deported two days later.

== Progress ==
=== First wave of protests ===
Anti-Japanese demonstrations in Nanjing on 16 September, filmed at Zhongyang Road.

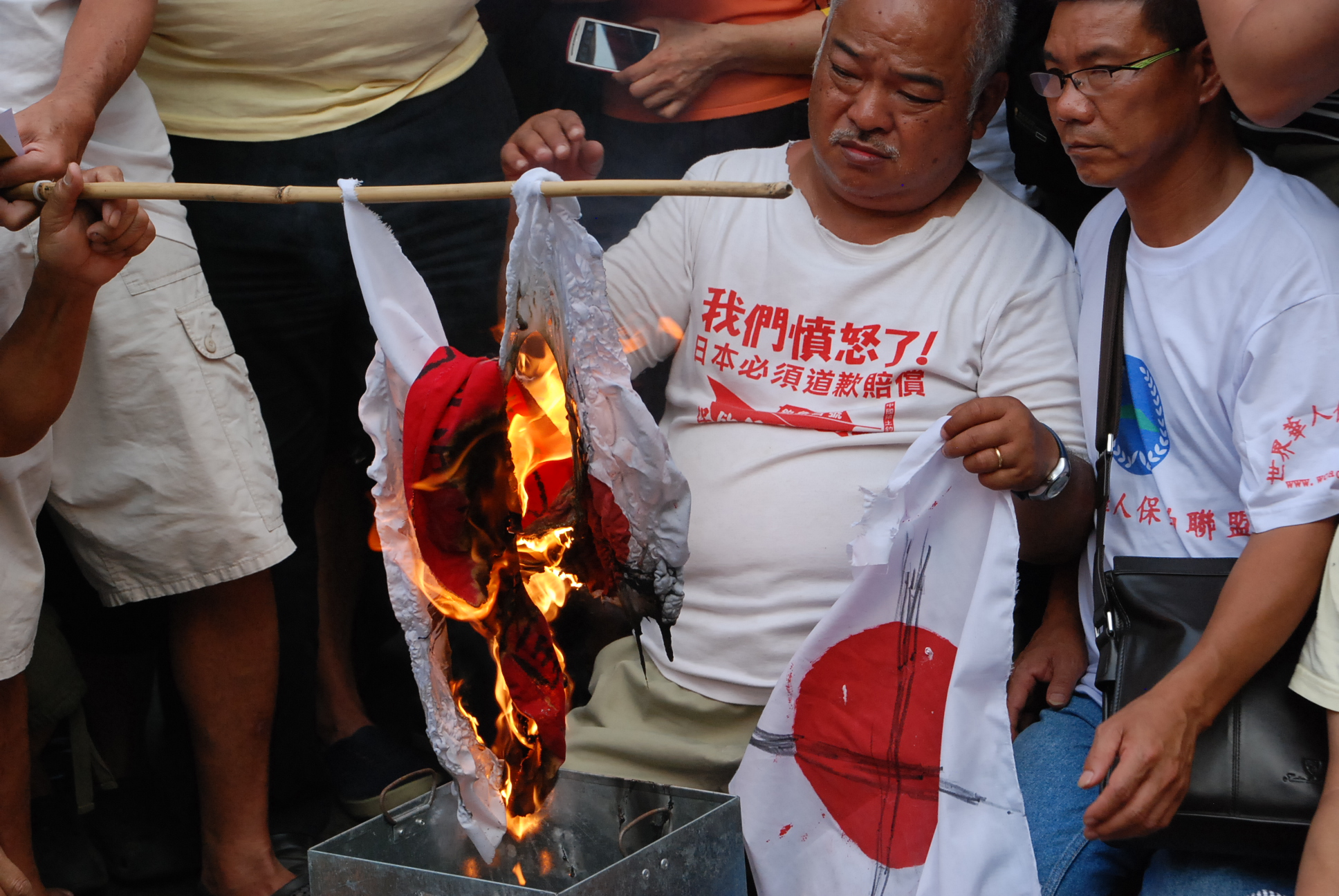
Protestors burn the Japanese national flag in front of Consulate-General of Japan in Hong Kong, featuring Tsang Kin-shing on the second right

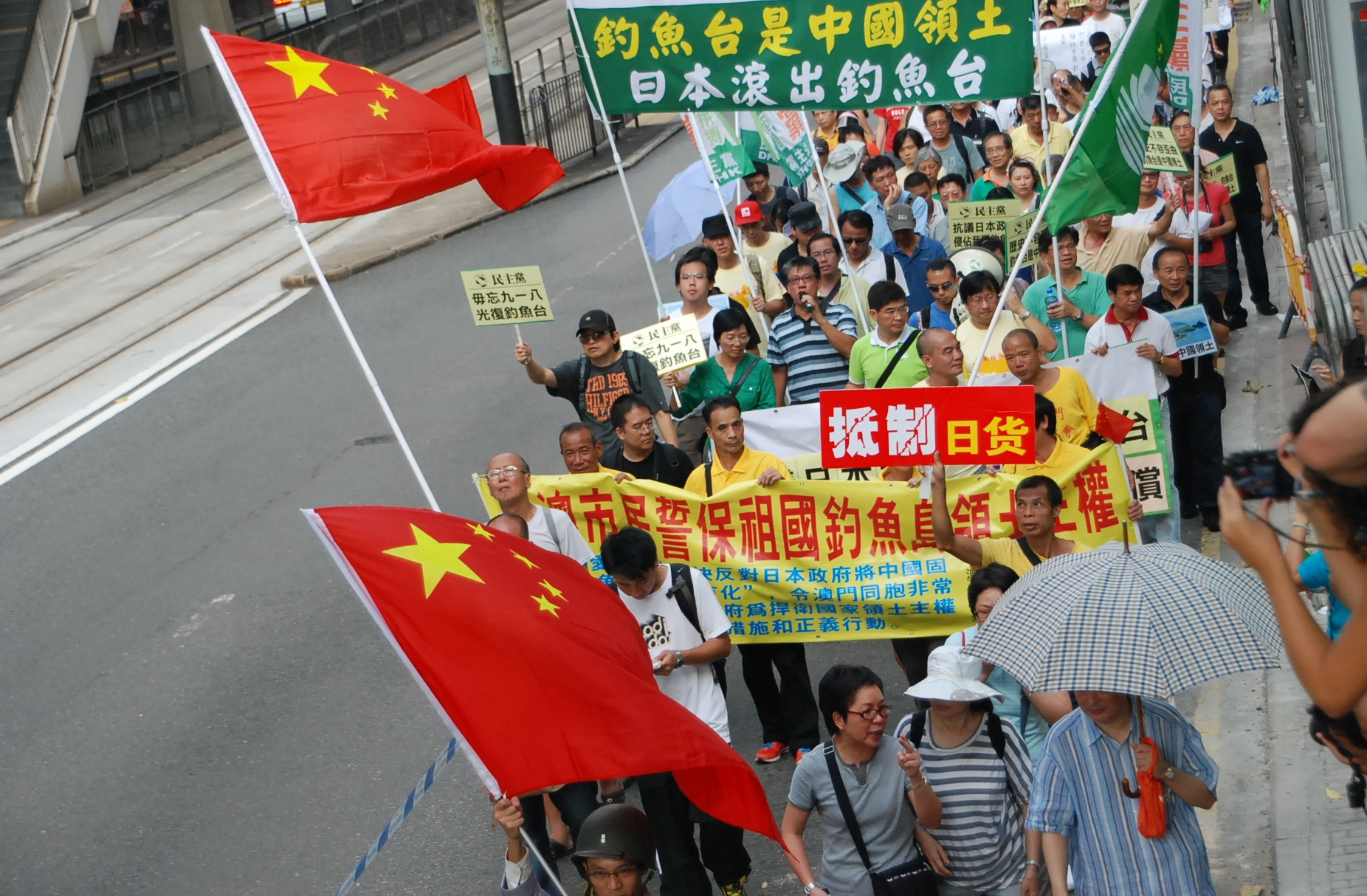
A procession led by the Hong Kong Action Committee for Defending the Diaoyu Islands, one of the main protest organizers on 16 September 2012

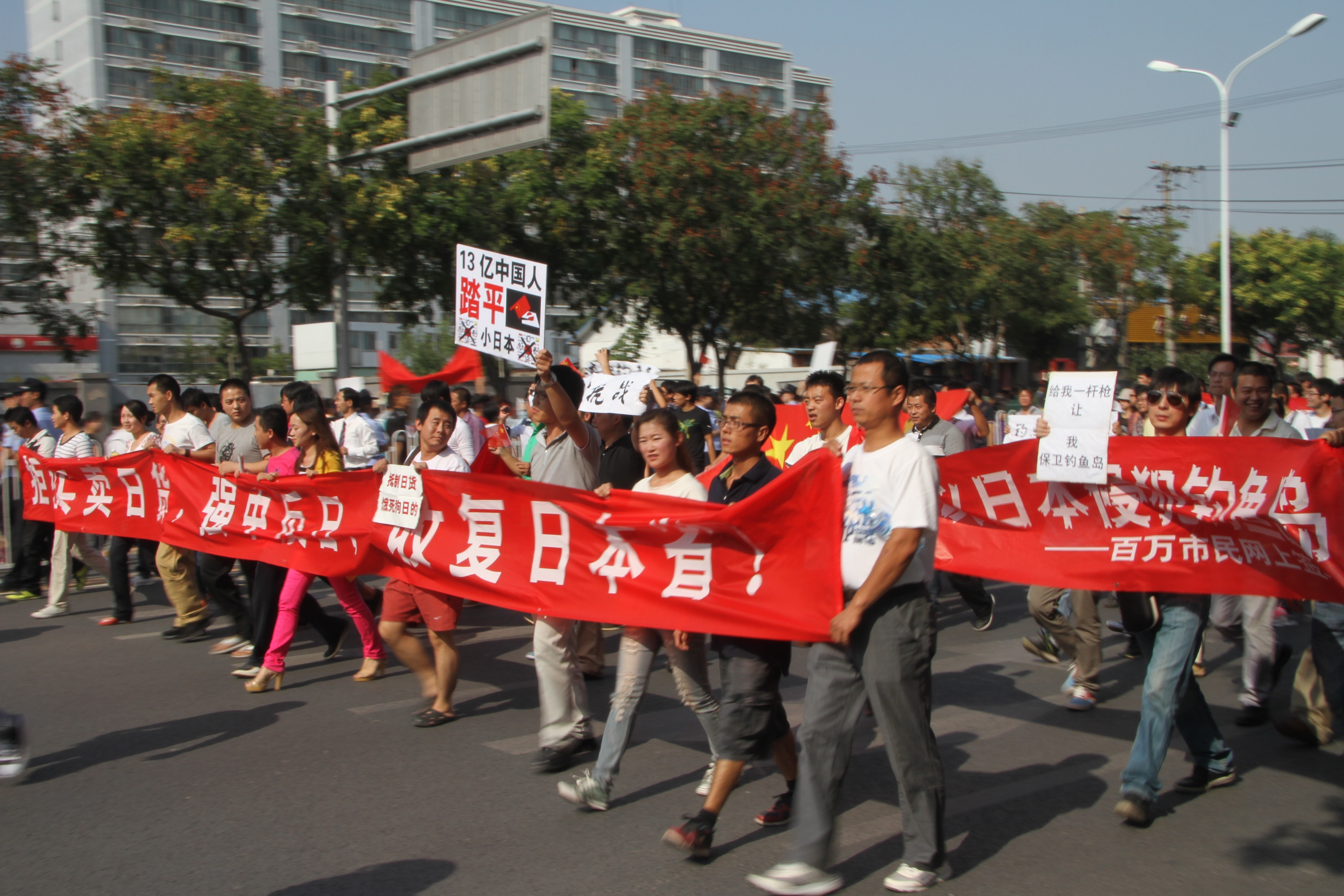
Anti-Japanese demonstrations in front of Japanese embassy in Beijing on 18 September. The center sign written "1.3 billion Chinese will trample over puny Japan (13亿中国人踏平小日本)".

After the detainment of Hong Kong activists by the Japanese Coast Guard, netizens in mainland China called for a nationwide protest against Japan on 19 August.

In Beijing, citizens began protesting in front of the Japanese embassy on 15 August. On the morning of 19 August, a crowd of demonstrators gathered and held placards bearing phrases such as "Return us the Diaoyu Islands" and "Japan must confess her crimes".

In Shenzhen, protesters marched down the streets chanting slogans such as "Defend the Diaoyu Islands" and "Smash Japanese Imperialism", called for the boycott of Japanese goods and for the government to retake the islands. In the process, many protesters tore up Japanese flags, smashed Japanese-branded cars and vandalized shops selling Japanese goods; rocks were hurled at a Ramen shop. The protests lasted until about 2pm. According to Sing Tao Daily, the government sent in large numbers of armed police, who called for an end to the violent protests, began driving the protesters away and detaining several over-reacting protesters.

The anti-Japanese protests were occasionally employed by protesters who sought to criticize the Chinese government. Such demonstrations included marching with posters of the late Chinese leader Mao Zedong—perceived to be more assertive on issues of sovereignty than current leaders, as well as signs about corruption, food safety, and income inequality. Supporters of the ousted anti-capitalist leader Bo Xilai also had a showing during the protests.

There were also protests of varied intensities in other major cities such as Jinan, Qingdao, Guangzhou, Taiyuan, Shenyang, Changchun, Harbin, Chengdu and Hangzhou. There were police officers maintaining order at the scenes to prevent incidents of violence.

=== Second wave of protests ===
The main cities of anti-Japanese demonstrations on September 15, 2012.

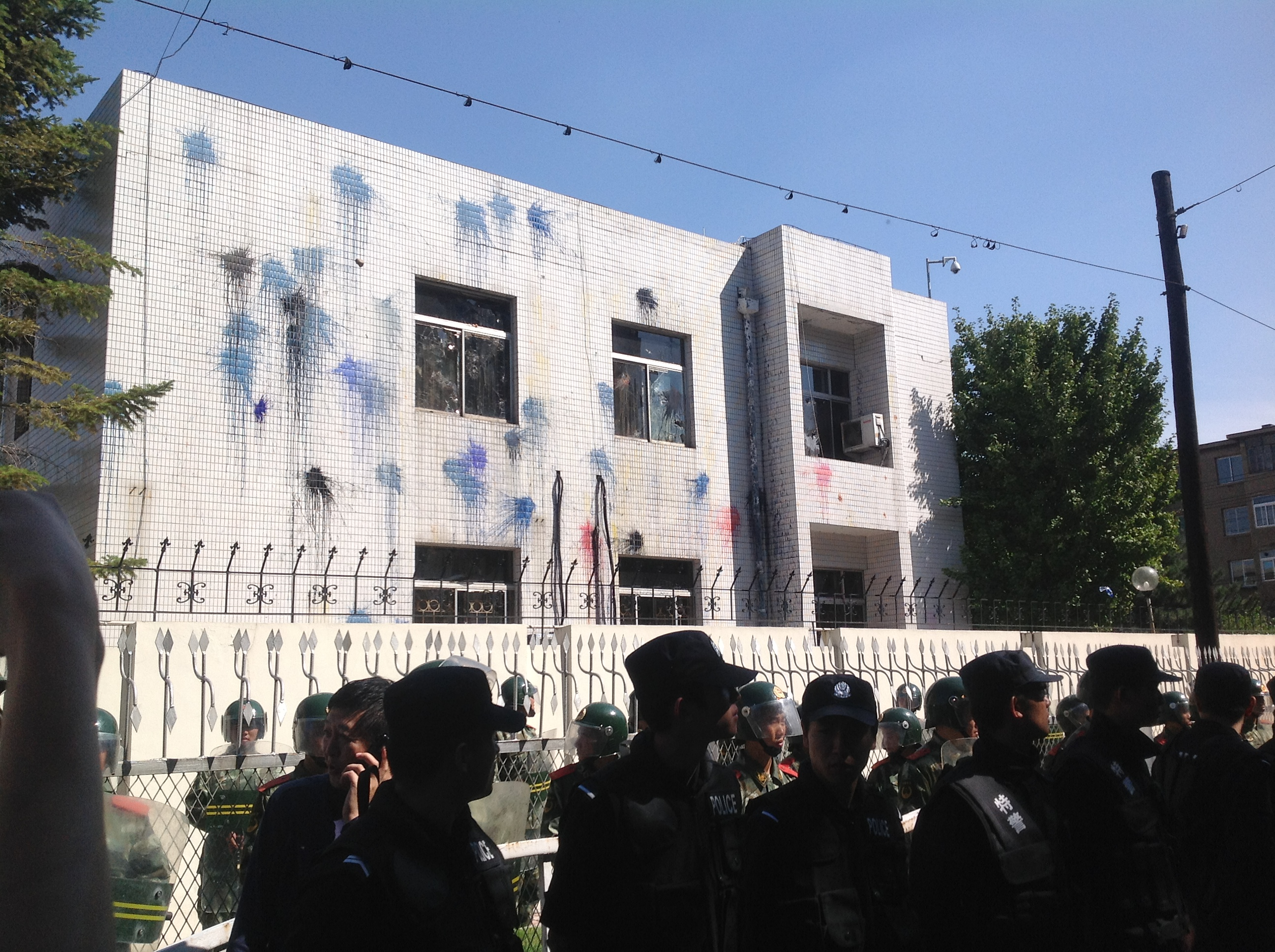
Anti Japanese protesters hurled ink bottles at the wall of the Japanese Consulate-General in Shenyang, China on September 18, 2012.

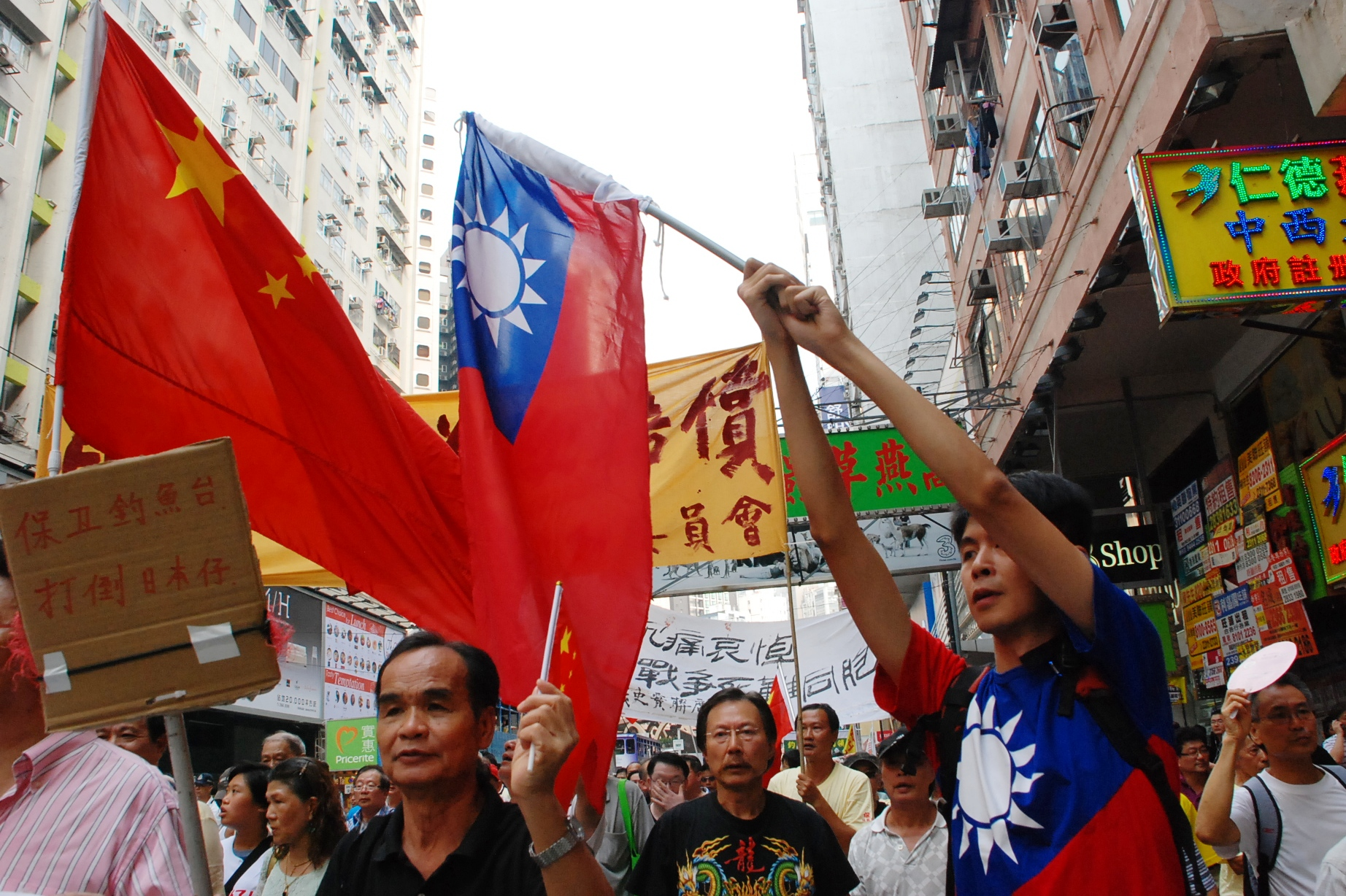
Chinese demonstrators wave the Flag of the People's Republic of China and the Flag of the Republic of China together in Hong Kong.

- On 11 September, China sent two patrol ships to the islands to demonstrate its claim of ownership. Japan formally nationalizes the three islands that were held in the ownership of Kunioki Kurihara.
- On 13 September, Chinese government submitted a nautical chart with baselines of the territorial sea on disputed islands to the United Nations. Former president of Republic of China Lee Teng-hui remarked "The Senkaku islands were Japanese territory in the past and are still so at present."
- On 15 September, a large number of citizens in mainland China participated in protest marches and called for a boycott of Japanese products. These demonstrations became violent in some cities, with reports of arson, vandalism and other criminal acts emerging from Changsha and Qingdao. Japanese-made cars were vandalized in numerous cities. Around 10 Japanese companies in Qingdao were damaged. Anti-Japanese protesters set on fire a sales outlet of Toyota. A Panasonic factory in Shandong was set ablaze and another Panasonic factory in Suzhou was also damaged by protesters. Heiwado, a Japanese department store in Changsha, was ransacked. JUSCO, a Japanese department store in Qingdao, was also ransacked. Several thousand protesters also broke into the Garden Hotel in Guangzhou housing the Japanese Consulate General, smashed windows and attacked a Japanese restaurant.
- On the weekend of 15–16 September, citizens in mainland China participated in protest marches and called for a boycott of Japanese products in as many as 85 Chinese cities, including Shanghai, Shenyang, Zhengzhou, Hangzhou and Harbin, as well as Hong Kong. Demonstrations escalated to arson of Japanese vehicles and other criminal acts in Beijing, Shenzhen, Guangzhou, Changsha, Suzhou, Mianyang, Xi'an, Qingdao, and Taipei.
- There were protests in Los Angeles, Houston, San Francisco, New York and Chicago, as well as a petition to the US government and Congress to take a neutral stance over the dispute.
- South China Morning Post reporter Felix Wong was reportedly beaten by police in Shenzhen while covering the protests.
- US Defense Secretary Leon Panetta told reporters "I am concerned that when these countries engage in provocations of one kind or another over these various islands that it raises the possibility that a misjudgment on one side or the other could result in violence and could result in conflict"
- On 16 September, the China officially announced that it would request the natural extension of its continental shelf up to the Okinawa Trough, extending the EEZ, to the UN Commission on the Limits of the Continental Shelf. In Shenzhen, about 2,000 protesters tried to push their way into a Chinese Communist Party facility and clashed with the People's Armed Police. Protesters hurled bottles at the police guard in front of the Communist Party facility and threw rocks at the vehicles parked in the lot of the Communist Party building.
- On 17 September, Kōichirō Genba met with United States Secretary of Defense Panetta, who confirmed previous commitments and pushed for de-escalation.
- On 18 September, people in over 180 cities of China attended protests on the 81st anniversary of the Mukden Incident.
  - The car of Gary Locke, the U.S. Ambassador to China, was blocked from entering the Japanese embassy by protesters who chanted slogans referencing the U.S.–Japan Security Treaty. Protesters hurled bottles at the U.S. ambassador's car and grabbed the American flag. Chinese security forces broke up the band of protesters such that, according to Locke, "It was all over in a matter of minutes, and I never felt in any danger." Chinese officials have expressed regret over the case and are investigating the "individual" incident.
- Anti-Japanese protesters hurled ink bottles at the wall of the Japanese Consulate General in Shenyang.
- On 25 September, Japanese and Taiwanese ships sprayed water at each other after a Taiwanese flotilla briefly sailed into what Japan says are its territorial waters.

== Crackdown ==
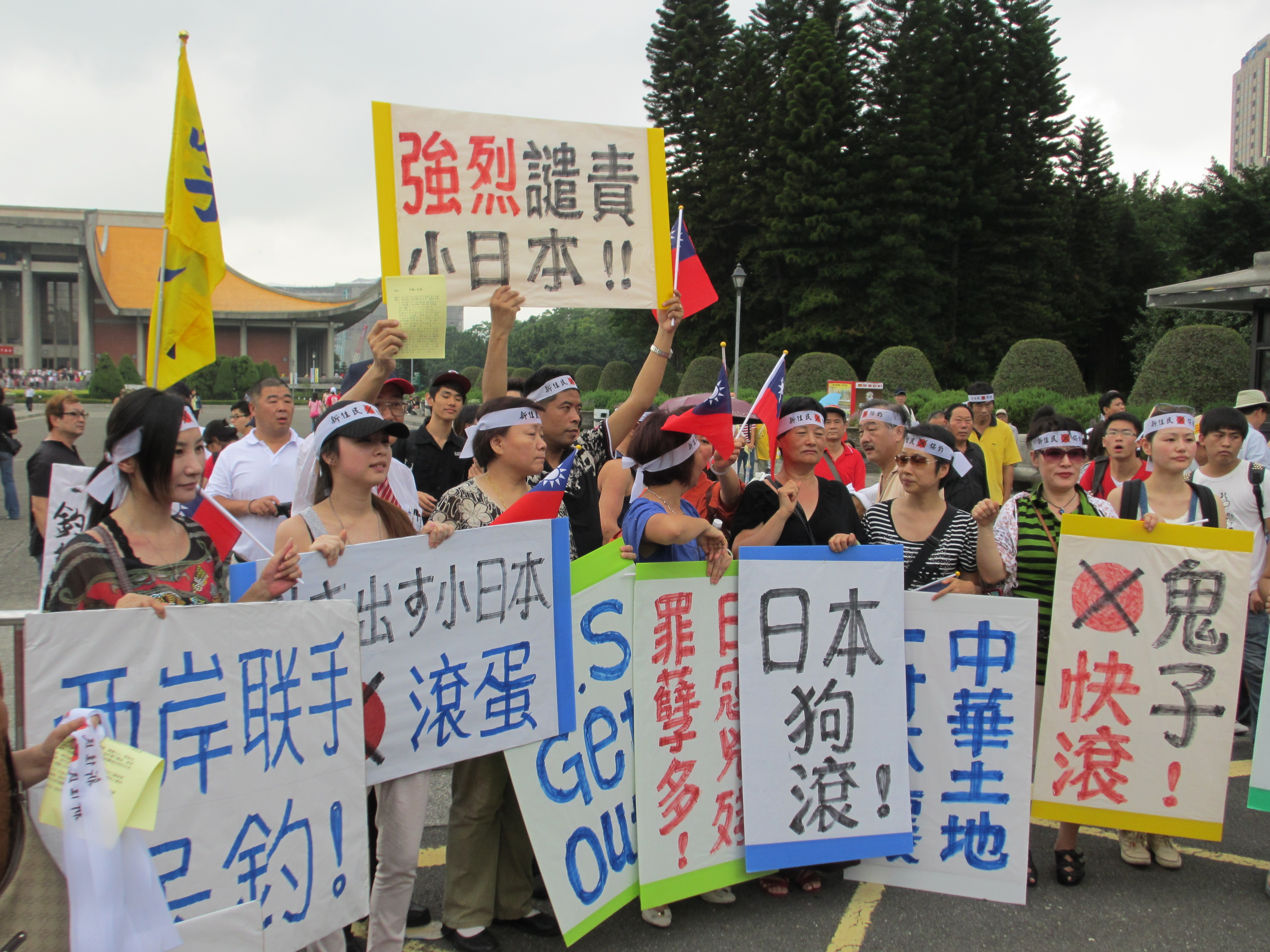
Demonstrators in Taiwan hoist signs telling "Japanese devils" and "little Japan" to "get out" of the disputed islands following the escalation in disputes in 2012.

On 17 September, police in the city of Xi'an banned large protests and forbade the use of phone and online messages to organize illegal protests. For the duration of the week, paramilitary troops in Shanghai provided round-the-clock protection to the Japanese consulate, stripping demonstrators of projectiles, warning them against violence with megaphones, and limiting demonstrators' time at the site to a few minutes. On September 18, police in Qingdao city arrested six people for violent acts in connection with the demonstrations. Guangzhou authorities arrested 18 people who committed anti-Japanese vandalism and asked the public to submit evidence against other violators. Governments elsewhere in Guangdong Province warned citizens against being present in large crowds.

On 19 September, national authorities deployed riot police to suppress existing protests and to prevent their re-occurrence. Stations near to protest sites were closed by Beijing subway authorities, roads were re-opened to traffic, and Beijing-wide text messages warned citizens against further demonstrations. Outside of minor protests in Shanghai, no demonstrations were reported on the 19th. Police stations across the country vowed retribution against rioters on Weibo, and China's commerce ministry urged foreign companies to report damage to the authorities. The Japanese embassy in Beijing confirmed that there were no longer protests at that location, and Japanese businesses which had shut down during the protests re-opened.

On 21 September, dozens of Japanese coast guard officials and Okinawa Prefecture police officers landed on the Uotsuri island, a largest island of Senkaku islands to prepare for the landing of Taiwanese activists.

On 22 September, the United States Marine Corps and Japanese Ground Self-Defense Force proceeded with an amphibious assault drill on the scenario of retaking an island occupied by enemy forces.

== Economic impact ==
During the protests against Japan, there were calls of boycotts of Japanese goods in addition to the destruction of several existing Japanese products. Many Japanese businesses and factories in China were shuttered in reaction to the protests. Some Chinese group tours to Japan were cancelled, dealing a blow to the Japanese tourism industry. The Japanese car manufacturing industry suffered a loss of $250 million between 15 and 21 September due to the production of about 14,000 cars being suspended. Rioters looted and smashed the windows of several AEON shopping malls, doing $8.8 million of damage to one location; despite this, AEON continued with its expansion into China, but focused on selling Chinese-made goods, and kept Japanese-made ones to about 5%. The Guardian predicted a global slowdown of economy due to the protests.

Chinese authorities asked booksellers in Beijing to ban books by Japanese authors and titles about Japanese topics, and pressured Chinese publishers not to translate and publish Japanese content in response to China-Japan conflict. Bookstores got rid of all publications related to Japan or written by Japanese authors. On October 12, the entrepreneur-philanthropist Chen Guangbiao spent over $770,000 of his own money to buy new Geely cars for 172 owners of Japanese cars that were vandalized during the protests.

== Reactions ==
=== China ===
- On 19 August, the Ministry of Foreign Affairs has strongly protested to the Japanese Ambassador to China. Spokesperson Qin Gang expressed, with regards to the landing of Japanese activists on the disputed islands, that such illegal action is a breach of Chinese territorial sovereignty and that Japan should handle current actions appropriately to avoid stirring up bilateral relations.
- On 20 August, the Fujian provincial government decided to delay commemoration activities held with the Japanese Okinawa prefecture, citing current unsuitable atmosphere for such celebrations in the country. The activities were originally scheduled for 4 September.
- The PRC Ministry of Foreign Affairs urged people to express thoughts "rationally and within the law". Japanese prime minister Yoshihiko Noda urged China to prevent anti-Japanese violence. The United States urged calm.
- From 17 to 18 September, the Japanese School of Beijing canceled classes.

=== Japan ===
- On 19 August, Vice Foreign Minister Ken'ichirō Sasae expressed that the protests made by China are "unacceptable" and voiced regret over anti-Japanese protests in China.
- On 20 August, the 10 Japanese activists who landed on the disputed islands were prosecuted for law-breaking and put under trial by the Okinawan police.
- On 20 August, Chief Cabinet Secretary Osamu Fujimura told a news conference that "Both countries do not want the Senkaku issue to affect overall bilateral ties. The Sino-Japanese relationship is one of the most important bilateral ties for Japan, and it is indispensable for the stability and prosperity of the Asia-Pacific region for China to play a constructive role".
- On 20 August, the ruling Democratic Party of Japan proposed to the government to take appropriate actions to prevent incidents of detaining activists from recurring.
- On 18 September, the Japanese right-wing group Ganbare Nippon, which had previously organized landings onto the disputed islands, organized an anti-Chinese counter-protest in Tokyo which commanded a turnout of about 50.
- Honda temporarily closed down all of its five major assembly plants in China. Toyota left temporary closure decisions to subsidiaries to decide on their own based on local conditions. Nissan temporarily closed two of its three factories in the country. Mazda decided to suspend production at its Nanjing plant for four days. Sony decided to suspend two of its seven factories in China for a short time. Two Panasonic factories in China, located in Qingdao and Suzhou, were damaged by attacks. Canon temporarily closed down three of its factories in China. Kobe Steel suspended operations at four factories by September 19, 2012. Fast Retailing suspended operations at 19 of its outlets in China.

=== Media comments ===
- China Youth Daily commented that the protests occurred as a result of wrongful attitude and actions on Japan's part, which had "hurt the feelings of the Chinese people". It claimed that the boycott of Japanese products is a sharp stand to "express the inviolable dignity of the Chinese people", and denounced instances of beating and smashing.
- BBC correspondent in Beijing Martin Patience claims that the protests were "almost certainly sanctioned by the Chinese authorities" and that the government frequently used anti-Japanese sentiment to "deflect criticism of their rule" in the past.
- CNN expresses that "both nations would benefit from resolving the dispute quickly, with China facing a leadership change later in the year and Japan facing separate territorial fights with Seoul and Moscow".
- Reuters remarked that the anti-Japanese protests "reflect bitter Chinese memories of Japan's occupation of large parts of China in the 1930s and 1940s."

== See also ==
- 2005 anti-Japanese demonstrations
- 969 Movement
- Action Committee for Defending the Diaoyu Islands
- Anti-Japanese sentiment
- Anti-Japanese sentiment in China
- China Federation for Defending the Diaoyu Islands
- China–Japan relations
- Japan–Taiwan relations
- List of protests in the 21st century
