= Action Committee for Defending the Diaoyu Islands =

Hong Kong-based political organization

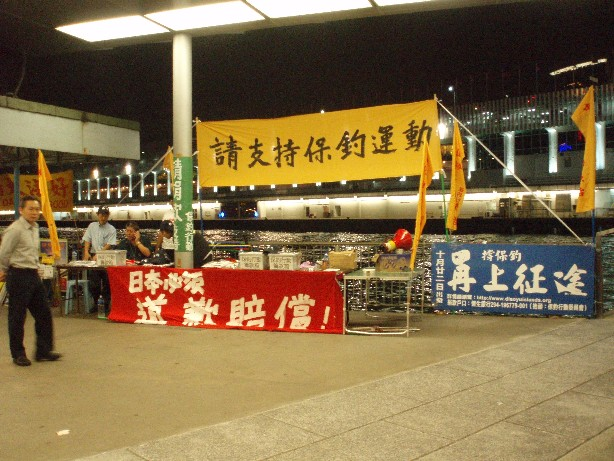
A table that was set up in Tsim Sha Tsui by the Action Committee for Defending the Diaoyu Islands

Action Committee for Defending the Diaoyu Islands (Chinese: 保釣行動委員會) is a Hong Kong-based activist organisation that asserts Chinese sovereignty over the Diaoyu Islands, called Senkaku Islands in Japan, in the Senkaku Islands dispute. The territorial right to the islands is disputed between the China, the Taiwan, and Japan, who currently controls them. The group regularly sends expeditions to the islands and would make landing on them to assert Chinese sovereignty.

In addition to its goals regarding the Diaoyu Islands, the group has also called for the Japanese government to apologise for its wartime atrocities and to stop distorting the history of World War II.

== Expedition in 2006 ==
On 22 October 2006, 22 activists set sail to the islands despite warnings from the Japanese government that it would expel them from entering waters around the islands. The crew consisted of 18 Hong Kongers, one mainland Chinese, one person from Macau, one Canadian, and one Australian. The expedition marked the tenth anniversary of the group's first expedition to the islands, and it also served to commemorate the death of David Chan Yuk-cheung, a member of the first expedition who drowned while trying to land on the islands.

The crew reached the islands but was unable to actually make a landing, due to interception by the Japanese coast guard. They returned to Hong Kong on 30 October, and according to newspaper, The Standard, received a "Heroes' welcome". Despite having failed to land, Action Committee for Defending the Diaoyu Islands declared that the expedition was an "absolute success". Committee member Ku Kwai Yiu said that the expedition had made the governments involved take note of the issue.

David Ko Wah Bing, a member of the expedition, claimed that the Japanese coast guard had acted recklessly by ramming the protestors' boat and tried to murder the protestors during their clash. The protestors reportedly were to petition the Chinese government to take legal action against Japan for "attacking a Chinese boat in Chinese waters".

== Other activities ==
The Action committee has also the Japanese government to issue a sincere apology about the use of sex slaves and provide compensation over the use of sex slaves during the second world war. Their aim is to remind the public about the plight of wartime sex slaves. They will showcase two life-size statues of so-called "comfort women" at various places in Hong Kong, along with the statues placed near the Japanese consulate in Central (since July 2017) which remain there till December 13, 2017 – the anniversary of the start of the 1937 Nanjing massacre.

== See also ==
- 2012 China anti-Japanese demonstrations
- Anti-Japanese sentiment in China
- China Federation for Defending the Diaoyu Islands
- Sino-Japanese relations
