= Jap =

Pejorative English abbreviation of "Japanese"

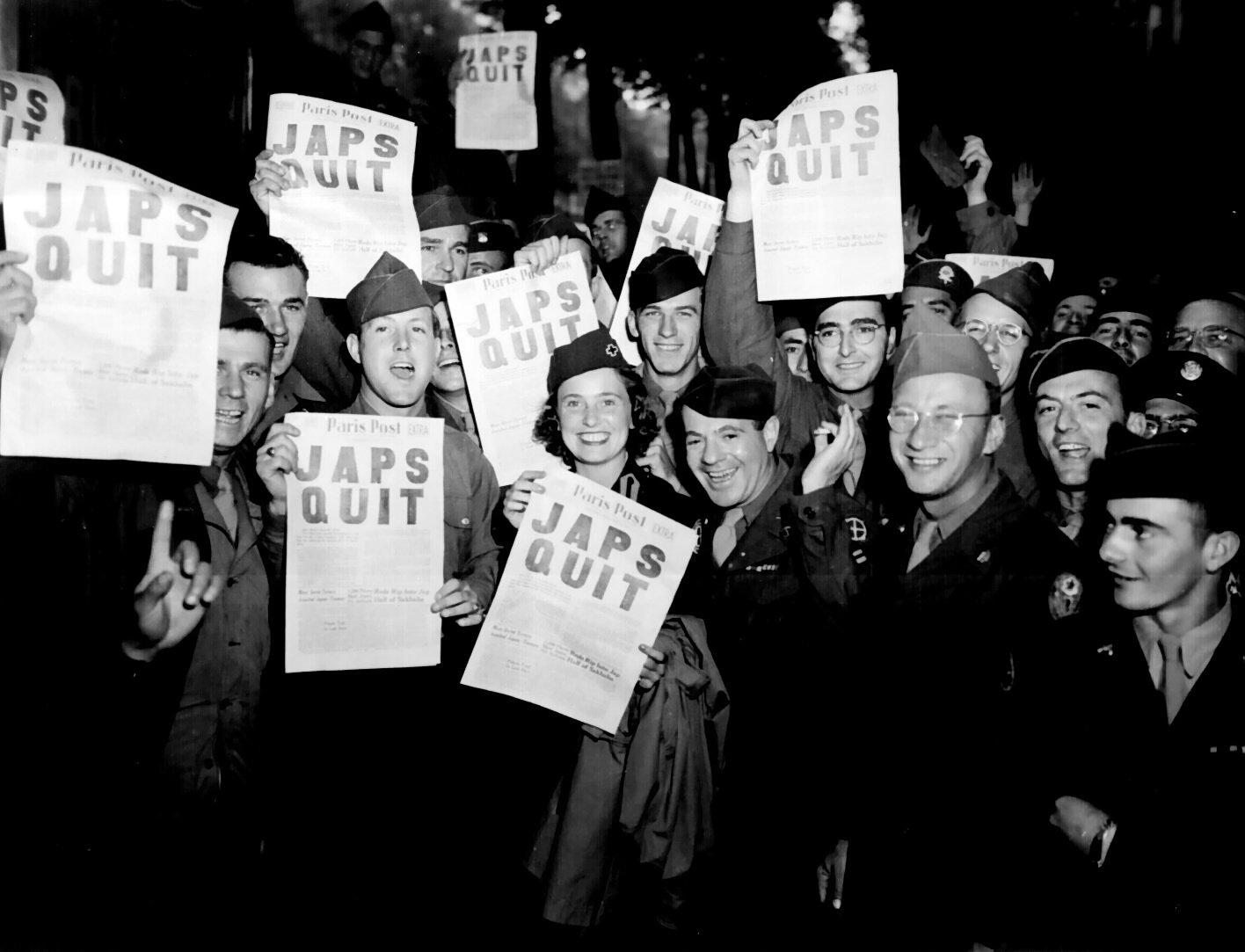
Headlines announcing Japan's surrender in World War II

Jap is an ethnic slur derived from the English abbreviation of the word "Japanese". In the United States, Japanese Americans have come to find the term offensive because of the internment they suffered during World War II. Before the attack on Pearl Harbor, Jap was not considered primarily offensive. However, following the bombing of Pearl Harbor and the Japanese declaration of war on the US, the term began to be used derogatorily, as anti-Japanese sentiment increased. During the war, signs using the epithet, with messages such as "No Japs Allowed", were hung in some businesses, with service denied to customers of Japanese descent.

== History and etymology ==
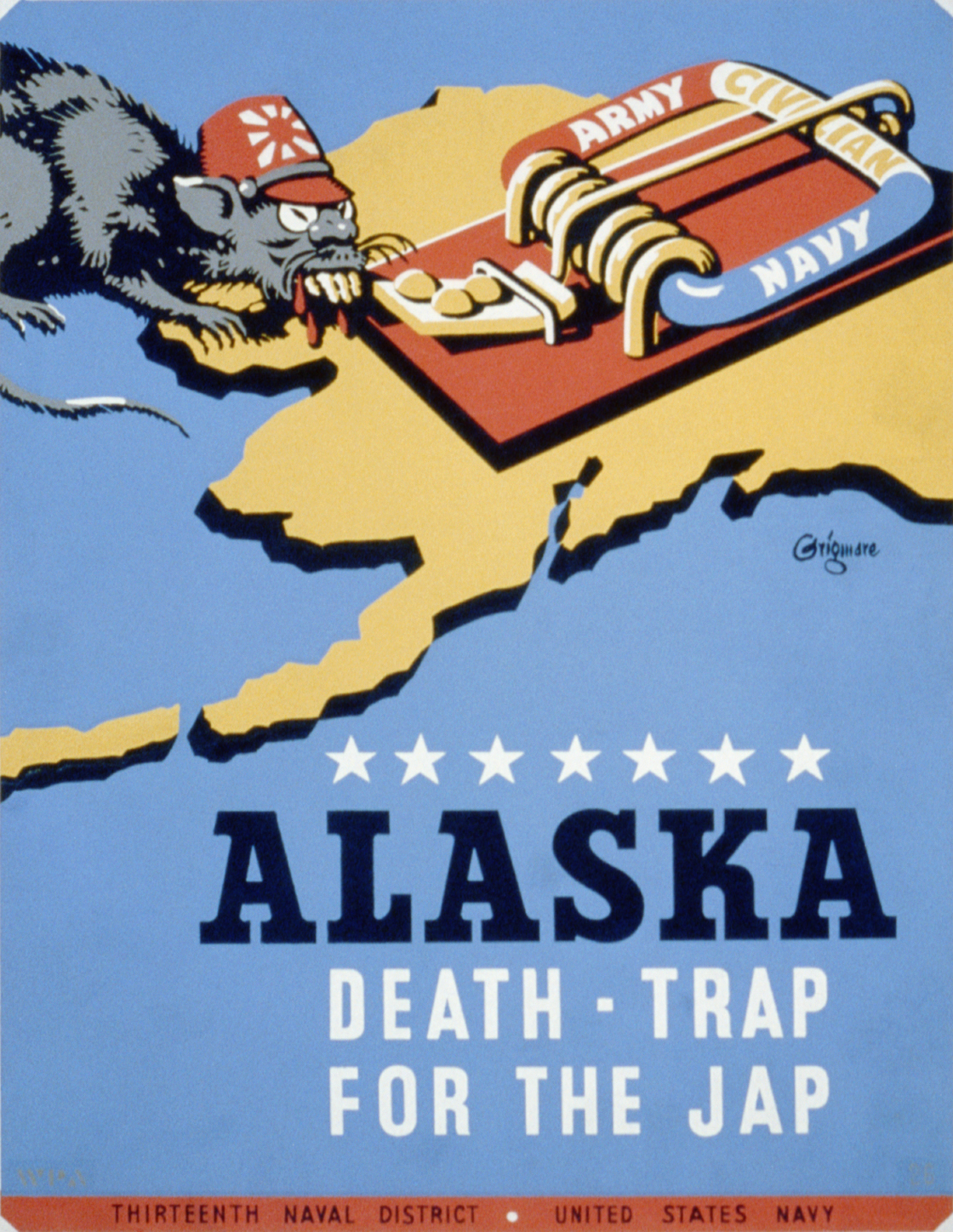
WWII propaganda poster using a rhyming slogan in its text

According to the Oxford English Dictionary, the earliest recorded use of Jap as an abbreviation for Japanese dates to 1854, in the diary of Edward Y. McCauley, a member of Commodore Perry's expedition to Japan: "The Commo: gives a Grand dinner to the Japs on the 27th". An example of benign usage was the previous naming of Boondocks Road in Jefferson County, Texas, originally named Jap Road when it was built in 1905 to honor a popular local rice farmer from Japan.

Later popularized during World War II to describe those of Japanese descent, Jap was then commonly used in newspaper headlines to refer to the Japanese and Imperial Japan. Jap began to be used in a derogatory fashion during the war, more so than Nip. Veteran and author Paul Fussell explains the rhetorical usefulness of the word during the war for creating effective propaganda by saying that Japs "was a brisk monosyllable handy for slogans like 'Rap the Jap' or 'Let's Blast the Jap Clean Off the Map'". Some in the United States Marine Corps tried to combine the word Japs with apes to create a new description, Japes, for the Japanese; this neologism never became popular.

In the United States, the term has now been considered derogatory; the Merriam-Webster Online Dictionary notes it is "disparaging". A snack food company in Chicago named Japps Foods (for the company founder) changed its name and eponymous potato chip brand to Jays Foods shortly after the attack on Pearl Harbor to avoid any negative associations with Japan. Spiro Agnew was criticized in the media in 1968 for an offhand remark referring to reporter Gene Oishi as a "fat Jap".

In Texas, under pressure from civil rights groups, Jefferson County commissioners in 2004 decided to drop the name Jap Road from a 4.3-mile (6.9 km) road near the city of Beaumont. In adjacent Orange County, Jap Lane has also been targeted by civil rights groups. The road was originally named for the contributions of Kichimatsu Kishi and the farming colony he founded. In Arizona, the state department of transportation renamed Jap Road near Topock, Arizona to "Bonzai Slough Road" to note the presence of Japanese agricultural workers and family-owned farms along the Colorado River there in the early 20th century. In November 2018, in Kansas, automatically generated license plates which included three digits and "JAP" were recalled after a man of Japanese ancestry saw a plate with that pattern and complained to the state.

== Reaction in Japan ==
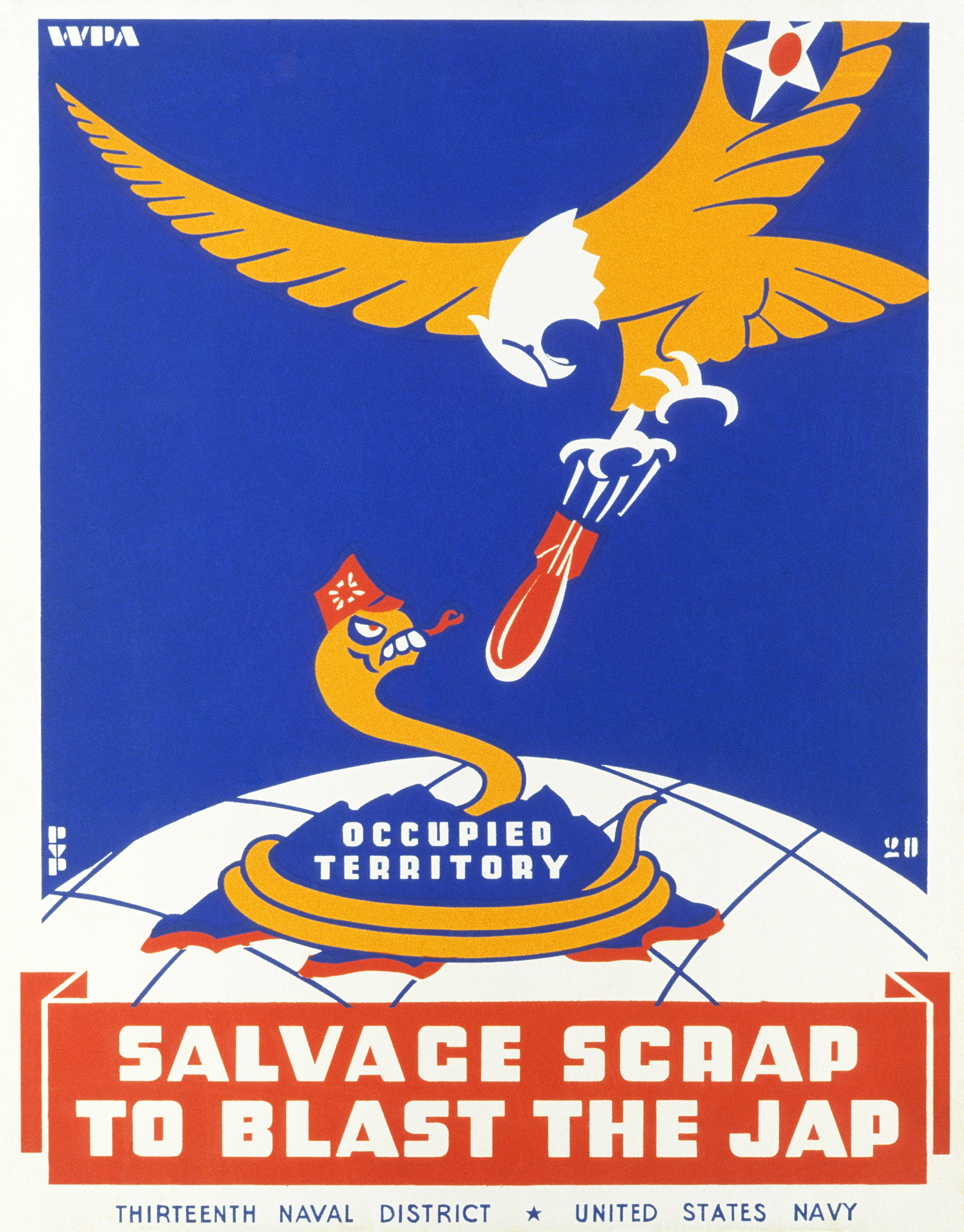
WWII propaganda poster showing a snake representing Japan being bombed by an eagle.

Koto Matsudaira, Japan's Permanent Representative to the United Nations, was asked whether he disapproved of the use of the term on a television program in June 1957, and reportedly replied, "Oh, I don't care. It's a [sic] English word. It's maybe American slang. I don't know. If you care, you are free to use it". Matsudaira later received a letter from the Japanese American Citizens League (JACL), and apologized for his earlier remarks upon being interviewed by reporters from Honolulu and San Francisco. He then pledged cooperation with the JACL to help eliminate the term Jap from daily use.

In 2003, the Japanese deputy ambassador to the United Nations, Yoshiyuki Motomura, protested the North Korean ambassador's use of the term in retaliation for a Japanese diplomat's use of the term "North Korea" instead of the official name, "Democratic People's Republic of Korea".

In 2011, after the term's offhand use in a March 26 article appearing in The Spectator ("white-coated Jap bloke"), the Minister of the Japanese Embassy in London protested that "most Japanese people find the word 'Japs' offensive, irrespective of the circumstances in which it is used".

== Around the world ==
=== Asia & Oceania ===
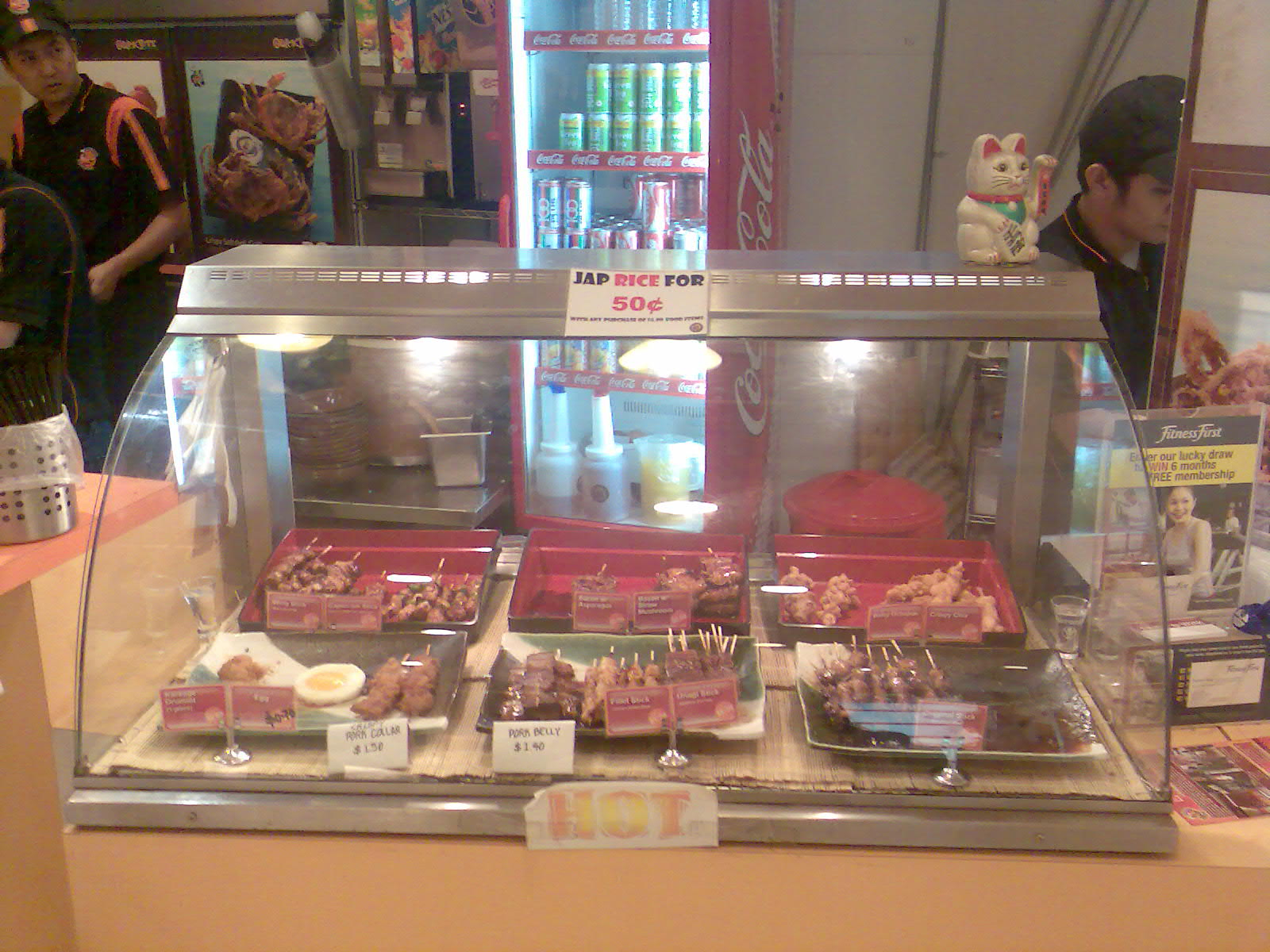
Neutral sign advertising "Jap Rice" in Singapore

In Singapore, the term is used relatively frequently as a contraction of the adjective Japanese rather than as a derogatory term. It is also used in Australia, particularly for Japanese cars and Japanese pumpkin.

In New Zealand, the phrase is a non-pejorative contraction of Japanese, although the phrase Jap crap is used to describe poor-quality Japanese vehicles.

=== Europe ===
In the UK, the term is variously seen as neutral or offensive. For instance, Paul McCartney used the term in his 1980 instrumental song "Frozen Jap" from McCartney II, maintaining that he had not intended to cause offense; the song's title was changed to "Frozen Japanese" for the Japanese market. "Nip" is the term that is usually used in the UK when the intention is to cause offence. In Ireland, Jap-Fest is an annual Japanese car show.

Similar to Australian, the analog Swedish word, japsare, is non-pejorative and particularly used for Japanese cars (singular and plural), mirroring the term jänkare ("yankee") for American cars. The plural form japsar ("japs") is commonly used to denote the Japanese collectively, analog to jänkar ("yankees"). Guling ("yellowling") is the term that is usually used in Sweden when the intention is to be racist. Similarly to Swedish, in Finnish, the term japsi (pronounced /yahpsi/) is frequently used colloquially for anything Japanese, with no derogatory meaning, similar to how the term jenkki ("yank") is used for anything American.

In 1970, the Japanese fashion designer Kenzo Takada opened the Jungle Jap boutique in Paris.

The word Jap is used in Dutch as well, where it is also considered an ethnic slur. It frequently appears in the compound Jappenkampen 'Jap camps', referring to Japanese internment camps for Dutch citizens in the Japanese-occupied Dutch Indies.

=== North & South America ===
In Canada, the term Jap Oranges was once very common, and was not considered derogatory, given the widespread Canadian tradition of eating imported Japanese-grown oranges at Christmas dating back to the 1880s (to the degree that Canada at one time imported by far the bulk of the Japanese orange crop each year). However, after WW2, consumers were still hesitant to purchase products from Japan. The term Jap was gradually dropped and they began to be marketed as "Mandarin Oranges". Today the term Jap Oranges is typically only used by older Canadians.

In Brazil, the term japa is sometimes used in place of the standard japonês as a noun and adjective. Its use may be inappropriate in formal contexts. The use of japa in reference to any person of East Asian appearance, regardless of their ancestry, can be pejorative.

== See also ==
- Nip, a similar slur
- Anti-Japanese sentiment
- Jjokbari (Korean)
- Guizi, Xiao Riben (Chinese)
- List of ethnic slurs
