= Xiao Riben =

Chinese language ethnic slur for people of Japanese descent

Xiao riben
- Chinese: 小日本
Transcriptions
Standard Mandarin
- Hanyu Pinyin: xiǎo rìběn

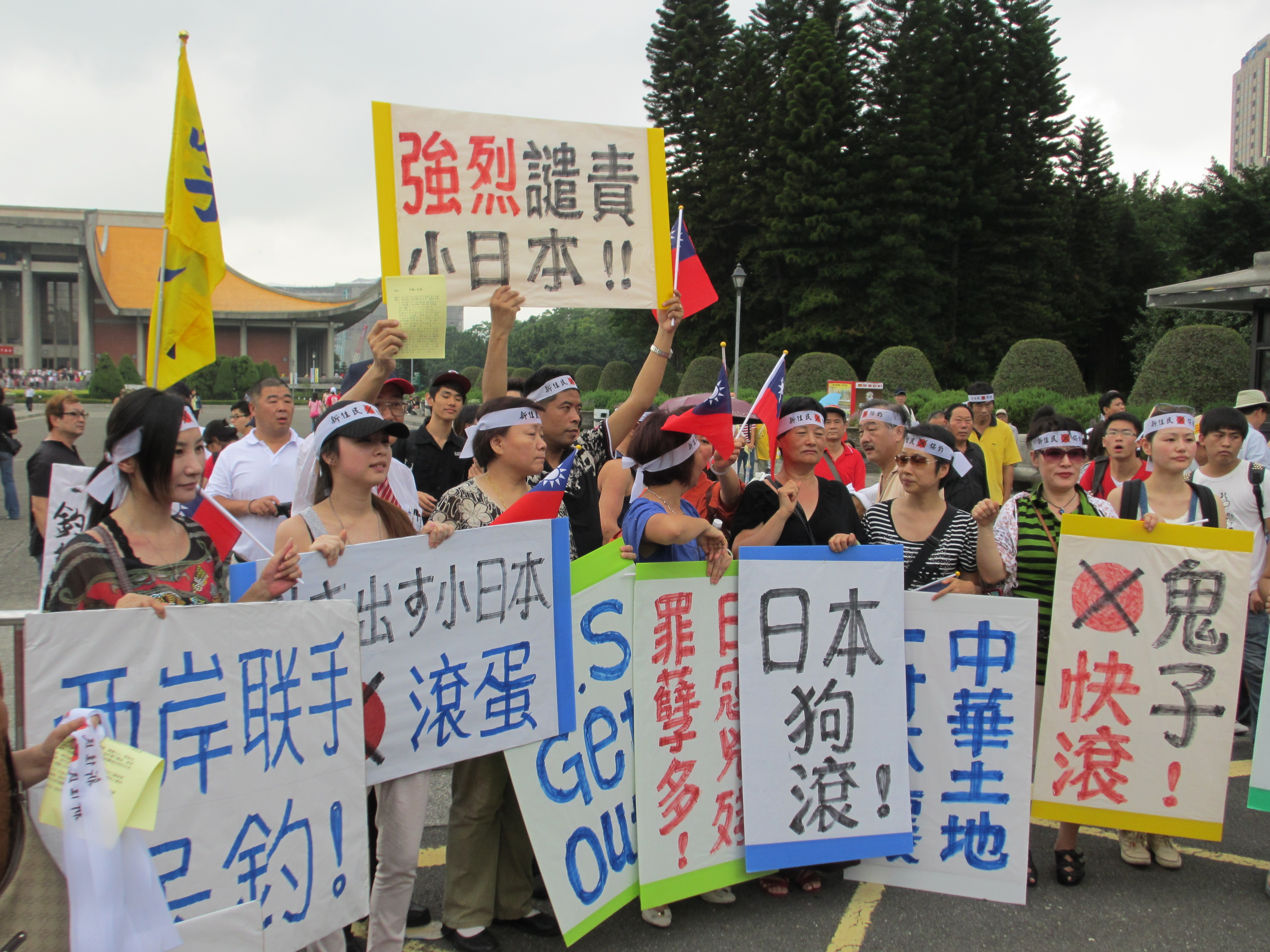
Anti-Japanese demonstrators hold a sign saying "[We] strongly condemn the Japanese!! (強烈譴責小日本!!)" during the 2012 China anti-Japanese demonstrations in Taiwan

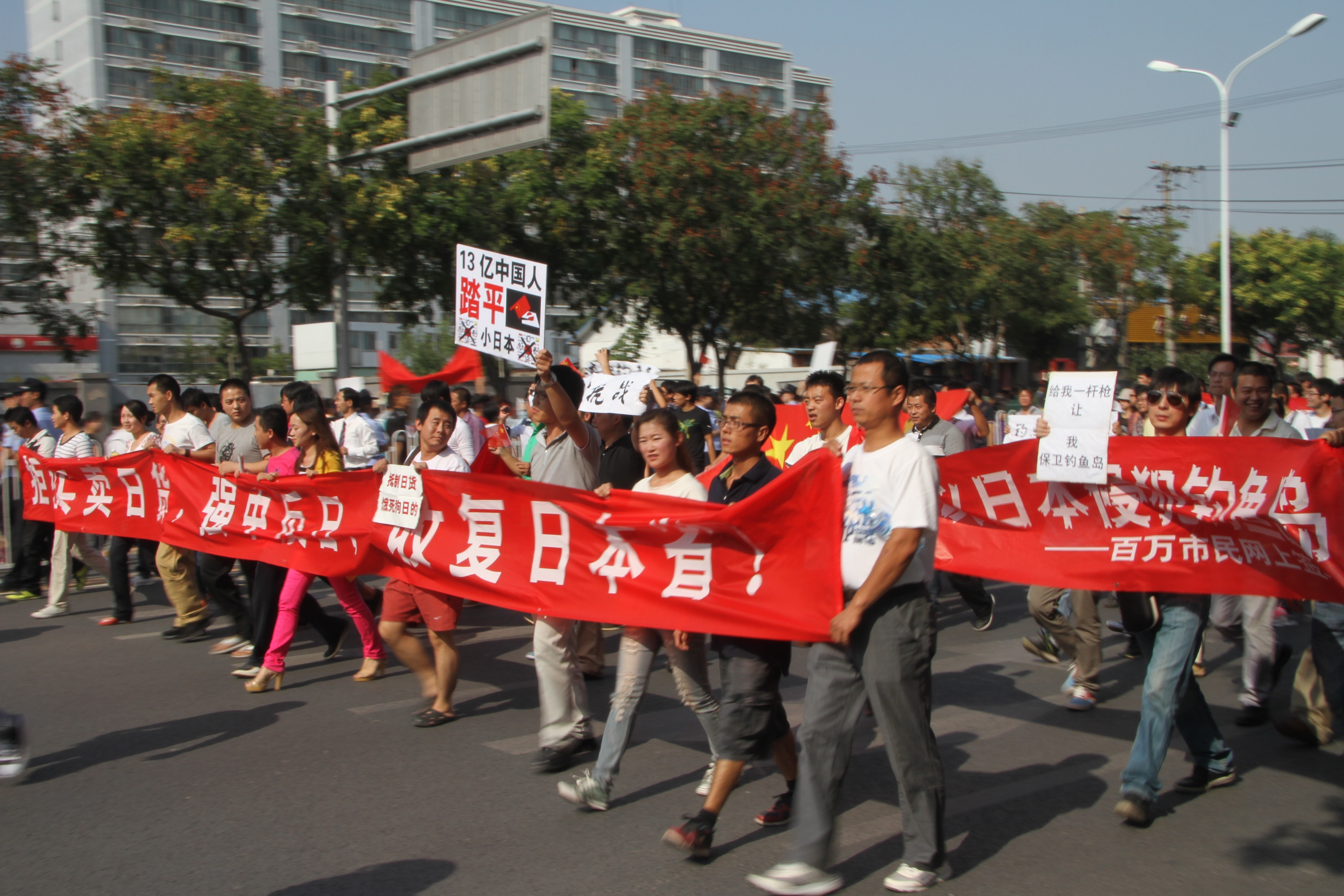
On September 18, 2012, anti-Japanese demonstrators march with a banner saying "1.3 billion Chinese stamp on the Japanese runts" (13亿中国人踏平小日本) in front of Japanese embassy in Beijing.

Xiao Riben (Chinese: 小日本; pinyin: xiǎo Rìběn) is a derogatory Chinese slang term for the Japanese people or a person of Japanese descent. Literally translated, it means "little Japan" or "little Japanese". It is often used with "guizi" or ghost/devil, such as "xiao Riben guizi", or "little Japanese devil".

== Usage ==
This is a derogatory term used in China against Japan from the beginning of the Second Sino-Japanese War until today.

== See also ==
- Jap
- Guizi
- Gweilo
- Hinomoto Oniko
- Shina
