= China Federation for Defending the Diaoyu Islands =

Chinese political organization

The China Federation for Defending the Diaoyu Islands (simplified Chinese: 中国民间保卫钓鱼台联合会; traditional Chinese: 中國民間保衛釣魚台聯合會; pinyin: Zhōngguó Mīnjiān Bǎowèi Diàoyútái Liánhéhùi) is an organization which maintains that the Senkaku Islands are a part of Chinese territory in the Senkaku Islands dispute. The territorial rights to the islands are disputed between China, Taiwan, and Japan, which currently has control over the islands.

In the early morning of March 24, 2004, seven activists from the group landed on the islands, planning to stay for several days. That afternoon, they were detained by the Japanese coast guard. The incident gave the territorial dispute renewed media attention and worsened Sino-Japanese relations.

== See also ==
- 2012 China anti-Japanese demonstrations
- Action Committee for Defending the Diaoyu Islands
- Anti-Japanese sentiment in China
