= Senkaku Islands dispute =

Territorial dispute in the East China Sea

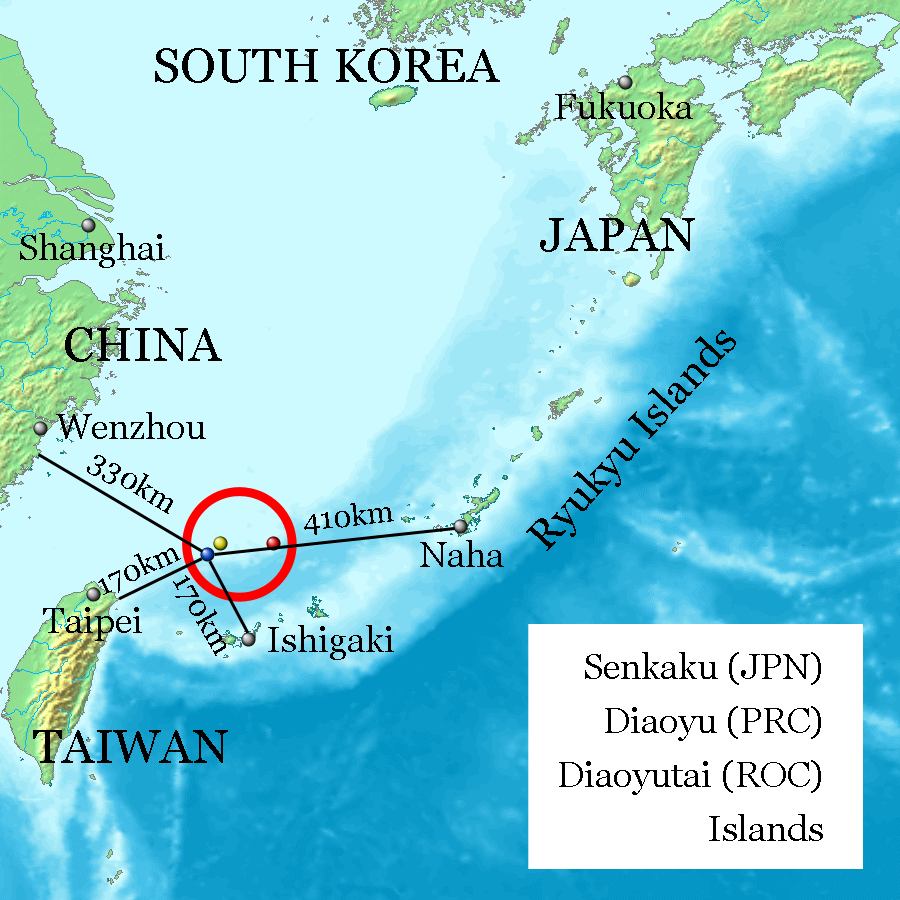
Location of the Senkaku Islands:
Uotsuri-shima (魚釣島) / Diaoyu Dao (釣魚島)
Kuba-shima (久場島) / Huangwei Yu (黃尾嶼)
Taishō-tō (大正島) / Chiwei Yu (赤尾嶼)

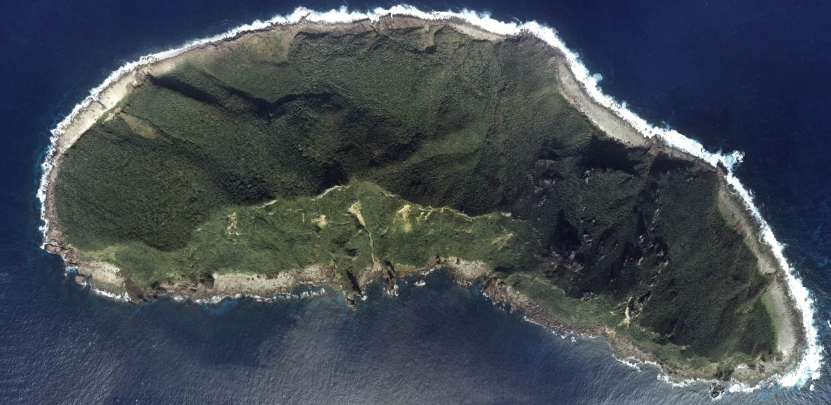
Uotsuri-shima, the largest of the Senkaku Islands at 4.3 km^{2} (1.7 sq mi), in an aerial photograph taken in 1978 by the MLIT, the omnibus ministry which operates the Japan Coast Guard.

The Senkaku Islands dispute, or Diaoyu Islands dispute, is a territorial dispute over a group of uninhabited islands known as the Senkaku Islands in Japan, the Diaoyu Islands in China, and Tiaoyutai Islands in Taiwan. Japan incorporated the islands in 1895 and controlled them until the end of World War II in 1945, after which the United States controlled the islands, which it administered as part of the Ryukyu Islands. In 1972, the United States transferred the islands to Japan. The islands are administered as part of the Okinawa Prefecture.

The islands are positioned close to key shipping lanes and rich fishing grounds, and there may be oil reserves in the area. Japan argues that it surveyed the islands in the late 19th century and found them to be terra nullius (Latin: land belonging to no one); subsequently, China acquiesced to Japanese sovereignty until the 1970s. According to Lee Seokwoo, China started taking up the question of sovereignty over the islands in the latter half of 1970 when evidence relating to the existence of oil reserves surfaced. Taiwan also claims the islands. The People's Republic of China (PRC) and Taiwan argue that documentary evidence prior to the First Sino-Japanese War indicates historical Chinese possession and that the territory is accordingly a Japanese seizure that should be returned as the rest of the Empire of Japan's conquests were returned in 1945.

In September 2012, the Japanese government purchased three of the disputed islands from their private owner, prompting large-scale protests in China and Taiwan. Although Japan viewed its move as an attempt to defeat Tokyo governor Shintaro Ishihara's more provocative attempt to buy the islands to develop infrastructure on them, the Chinese side viewed the purchase as an effort by Japan to bring the islands under Japanese sovereignty. On 23 November 2013, the PRC set up the East China Sea Air Defense Identification Zone which includes the Senkaku Islands, and announced that it would require all aircraft entering the zone to file a flight plan and submit radio frequency or transponder information.

The islands are included within the 1960 Treaty of Mutual Cooperation and Security between the United States and Japan, meaning that a defense of the islands by Japan would require the United States to come to Japan's aid.

== Islands ==
The Senkaku Islands are located in the East China Sea between Japan, China, and Taiwan. The archipelago contains five uninhabited islands and three barren rocks, ranging in size from 0.002 km^{2} to 3.81 km^{2}.

== Beginnings ==
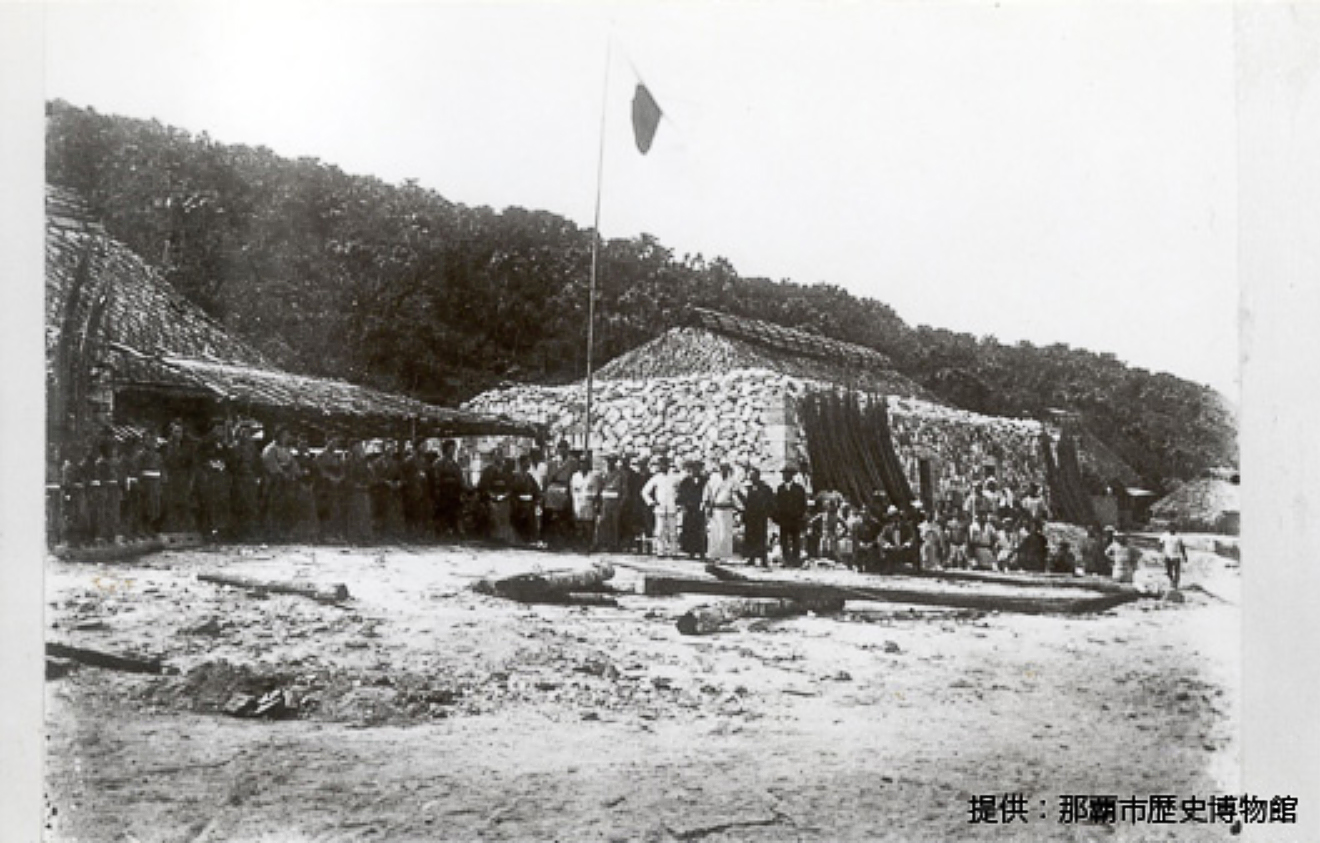
Workers at a bonito fisheries factory on Uotsurishima in the Senkaku Islands around 1910.

Following the Meiji Restoration, the Japanese government formally annexed what was known as the Ryukyu Kingdom as Okinawa Prefecture in 1879. The Senkaku Islands, which lay between the Ryukyu Kingdom and the Qing empire, became the Sino-Japanese boundary for the first time.

In 1885, the Japanese Governor of Okinawa Prefecture, Nishimura Sutezo, petitioned the Meiji government, asking that it take formal control of the islands. However, Inoue Kaoru, the Japanese Minister of Foreign Affairs, commented that the islands lay near to the border area with the Qing empire and that they had been given Chinese names. He also cited an article in a Chinese newspaper that had previously claimed that Japan was occupying islands off China's coast. Inoue was concerned that if Japan proceeded to erect a landmark stating its claim to the islands, it would make the Qing empire suspicious. Following Inoue's advice, Yamagata Aritomo, the Minister of the Interior, turned down the request to incorporate the islands, insisting that this matter should not be "revealed to the news media".

The dispute over the islands has its basis in the First Sino-Japanese War and the Treaty of Shimonoseki which concluded it. On 14 January 1895, during the First Sino-Japanese War, Japan incorporated the islands under the administration of Okinawa, stating that it had conducted surveys since 1884 and that the islands were terra nullius, with there being no evidence to suggest that they had been under the Qing empire's control. After China's defeat, the Treaty of Shimonoseki was signed in April 1895, requiring China to cede Taiwan (Formosa) and its associated islands to Japan. The treaty, however, did not clearly define the geographical scope of the "appertaining islands."

In the 1952 Treaty of San Francisco, Japan renounced sovereignty over Taiwan and its related islands. A disagreement remains between Japan, the PRC, and the ROC today as to whether the Senkaku Islands fall within the territories ceded in 1895. Both China and Taiwan claim sovereignty over the islands. China and Taiwan cite Yamagata Aritomo’s decision in 1885 not to incorporate the islands as evidence that they were historically excluded from Japanese territory.

The United States controlled the disputed islands after World War II. In 1972, the United States ended its occupation of Okinawa and the Ryukyu Island chain, which included the Senkaku Islands. Although the United States transferred administration of the islands to Japan as part of Okinawa, it did not take a position on the question of who their sovereign was.

Japan counters that the islands were placed under U.S. administration as part of the Ryukyu Islands under Article III of the San Francisco treaty, a status to which China did not object at the time. Japan further argues that the islands had been incorporated into Okinawa Prefecture prior to the Treaty of Shimonoseki, and that neither the treaty itself nor the negotiation records support the interpretation that the Senkaku Islands were included in the Formosa and the Pescadores, and therefore were not included in the territories ceded by China.

Lee Seokwoo, a Korean scholar of international law, notes the legal outcome of the dispute depends on the determination of the critical date—the point at which the territorial dispute crystallized. Lee concludes that the critical date should be 1971, when the dispute emerged with the signing of the Okinawa Reversion Treaty, rather than January 1895, and therefore "one is inclined to conclude that Japan has a stronger claim to the disputed islands". He states that the lack of objection from China or Taiwan during the 76 years constitutes a critical factor, emphasizing that historical evidence must be evaluated within the framework of international law regarding territorial acquisition, rather than as standalone history.

== China and Taiwan positions ==
=== Pre-1970s position ===
"I didn't care about the Senkaku Islands, but on the oil question, historians made it an issue."

— Zhou Enlai, in a meeting with Yoshikatsu Takeiri on 28 July 1972

Prior to the 1970s, neither the PRC nor the Republic of China governments made any official statements claiming sovereignty over the Senkaku Islands or disputing the sovereignty claims of other countries over it. Several maps, newspaper articles, and government documents from both countries after 1945 refer to the islands by their Japanese name, and some even explicitly recognize their status as Japanese territory. It was only the early 1970s that Chinese documents began to name them collectively as the Diaoyu Islands and as Chinese territory.

In 1953, the People's Daily, the official organ of the Central Committee of the Chinese Communist Party (CCP), referred to the Senkaku Islands by the Japanese name "Senkaku Shotō" and described the islands were a part of (then) U.S.-occupied Ryukyu Islands. In an article published on 8 January 1953 titled "Battle of people in the Ryukyu Islands against the U.S. occupation" the People's Daily wrote "The Ryukyu Islands lie scattered on the sea between the Northeast of Taiwan of China and the Southwest of Kyushu, Japan. They consist of 7 groups of islands; the Senkaku Islands, the Sakishima Islands, the Daitō Islands, the Okinawa Islands, the Oshima Islands, the Tokara Islands and the Ōsumi Islands."

A Chinese diplomatic draft written by the Ministry of Foreign Affairs of PRC on 15 May 1950 referred to the Senkaku Islands by the Japanese names "Senkaku shotō" and "Sentō Shosho" and indicated Chinese recognition of the islands as part of the Ryukyu Islands. The 10-page document titled "Draft outline on issues and arguments on parts concerning territories in the peace treaty with Japan" says the Ryukyus "consist of three parts—northern, central, and southern. The central part comprises the Okinawa Islands, whereas the southern part comprises the Miyako Islands and the Yaeyama Islands (Sentō Shosho)." The parentheses appear in the original. It also says "It should be studied whether the Senkaku Islands should be incorporated into Taiwan due to an extremely close distance," suggesting that the Chinese government did not consider the islands to be part of Taiwan. The passages leave no doubt that Beijing regarded the Senkaku Islands as part of the Ryukyu Islands as of 1950.

There are many official maps published by both Chinas after 1945 that support they did not recognize their sovereignty over the islands and they recognized the islands as Japanese territory. The PRC has been cracking down on "erroneous" maps in both print and digital forms, and government agencies have handled 1,800 cases involving map irregularities and confiscated 750,000 maps since 2005. The National Administration of Surveying, Mapping and Geoinformation said "as China is involved in several disputes with neighboring countries, it is vital to raise public awareness of the country's due territory."

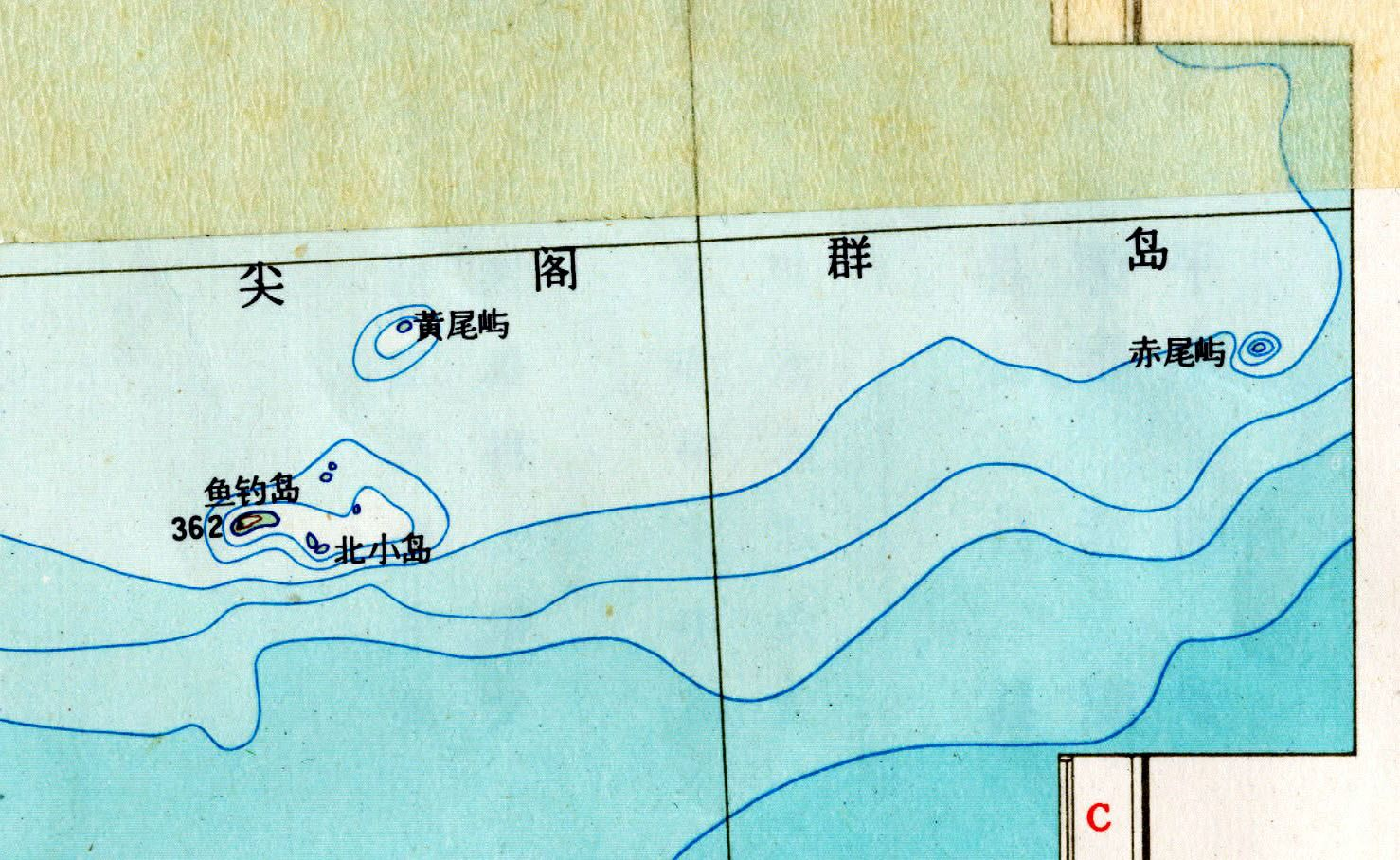
In a 1969 Atlas published by the Chinese State Bureau of Surveying and Mapping, the islands are shown with their Japanese name "Senkaku Guntō".

- An atlas made by the Chinese State Bureau of Surveying and Mapping (中国国家测绘总局) in 1969 referred to the overall group of islands by the Japanese name "Senkaku Guntō" (尖閣群島). The name of Uotsuri Island, the westernmost island in the group, was written in the Japanese name "Uotsuri-shima" (魚釣島).

- From 1946 to 1971, the Taiwan Statistical Abstract published by the Taiwanese Provincial Government stated "the easternmost point of Taiwan is Mianhua Islet and the northernmost point is Pengjia Islet", excluding the Senkaku islands. In 1972, immediately after the Executive Yuan of the ROC announced that the islands belonged to Yilan County of Taiwan Province in December 1971, the description was revised and the points were extended to the Senkaku Islands: "the easternmost point of Taiwan is Taishō-jima and the northernmost point is Kuba-jima."

- The Grand Atlas of the World Vol. 1 (世界地圖集第一冊 東亞諸國) published in October 1965 by the National Defense Research Academy (國防研究院) and the China Geological Research Institute of Taiwan records the Diaoyu Islands with Japanese names: Uotsuri-shima (Diaoyu Islands), Taishojima (Chiwei Island), and Senkaku Gunto in the "Map of the Ryukyu Islands". Taiwan and the Senkaku Gunto were clearly divided by a national border. The revised version in 1971, "Senkaku Gunto" was changed to the "Tiaoyutai Islets". Furthermore, the national border was relocated to an area between the Daioyutai Islands and the Ryukyu Islands. However, in the English index, the name "Senkaku Gunto" remained unrevised.

- The National Atlas of China Vol. 1 published by the National War College of Taiwan did not include Diaoyutai Islands in the map of "Taipei and Keelung" in the first (1959), second (1963), or even third (1967) editions. However the fourth edition (1972) included an extra map of the "Taio Yu Tai Islets" as part of the Taiwan's territory in the upper left corner of the map of "Taipei and Keelung".

Partial image of map showing Senkaku Islands in World Atlas published in China in 1960

- A world atlas published in November 1958, by the Map Publishing Company of Beijing, treats the Senkaku Islands as a Japanese territory and described them in Japanese name Senkaku Guntō (Senkaku Islands) and Uotsuri-Jima,

- In the 1970 junior high school geography textbook published by the National Institute for Compilation and Translation of Taiwan, the Diaoyutai Islands were named Senkaku Gunto in the "Physical Map of the Ryukyu Islands". Senkaku Gunto and the Ryukyu Islands were clearly not included in the Taiwan's territory by the national border on the map. However, in the 1971 edition, Senkaku Gunto was renamed Diaoyutai Islands, and the Taiwan national border was redrawn so that the Diaoyutai Islands were included.

=== Post-1970s position ===
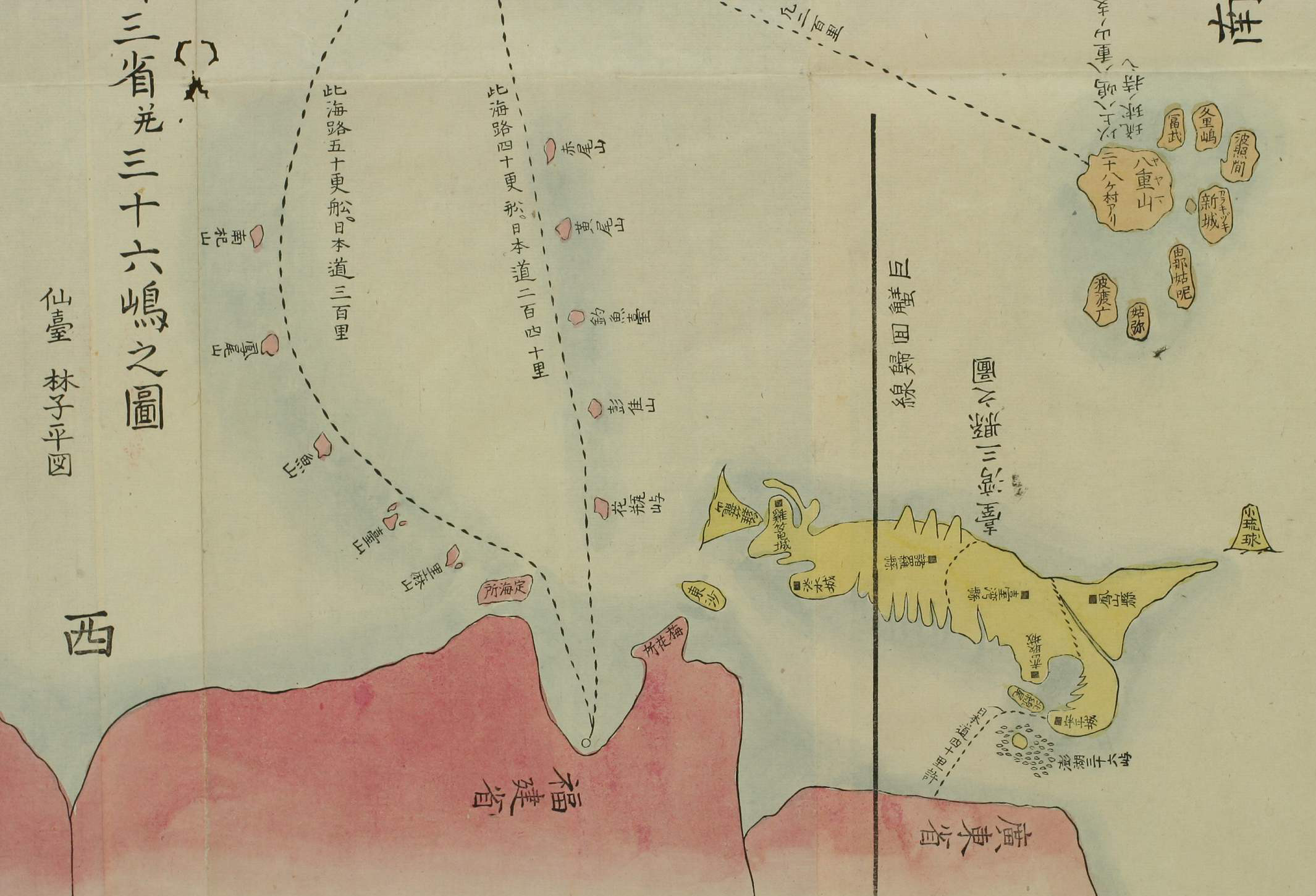
A 1785 Japanese map, the Sangoku Tsūran Zusetsu (三国通覧図説) by Hayashi Shihei adopted the Chinese kanji (釣魚臺 Diaoyutai) to annotate the Senkaku Islands, which were painted red in the same color as all other lands that it did not rule. The primary text itself can be found here.

Although Chinese authorities did not assert claims to the islands while they were under US administration, formal claims were announced in 1971 when the US was preparing to end its administration. A 1968 academic survey undertaken by United Nations Economic Council for Asia and the Far East found possible oil reserves in the area, which many believe explains the emergence of Chinese claims, a suggestion confirmed by statements made on the diplomatic records of the Japan-China Summit Meeting by PRC premier Zhou Enlai in 1972. However, supporters of China's claim that the sovereignty dispute is a legacy of Japanese imperialism and that China's failure to secure the territory following Japan's military defeat in 1945 was due to the complexities of the Chinese Civil War in which the Kuomintang (KMT) were forced off the mainland to Taiwan in 1949 by the Chinese Communist Party (CCP).

According to Chinese government claims, the islands were known to China since at least 1372, had been repeatedly referred to as part of Chinese territory since 1534, and were later controlled by the Qing dynasty along with Taiwan. The earliest written record of Diaoyutai dates back to 1403 in a Chinese book Voyage with the Tail Wind (zh:順風相送), which recorded the names of the islands that voyagers had passed on a trip from Fujian to the Ryukyu Kingdom.

By 1534, all the major islets of the island group were identified and named in the book Record of the Imperial Envoy's Visit to Ryukyu (使琉球錄). and were the Ming dynasty's (16th-century) sea-defense frontier. One of the islands, Chihweiyu, marked the boundary of the Ryukyu Islands. This is viewed by China and Taiwan as meaning that these islands did not belong to the Ryukyu Islands.

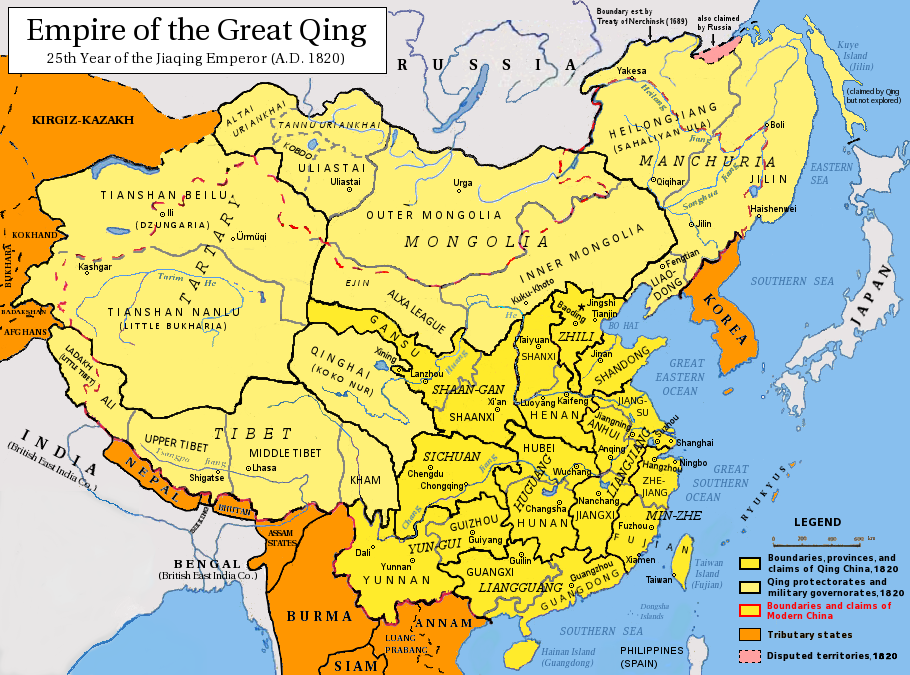
Qing dynasty in 1820, with provinces in yellow, military governorates and protectorates in light yellow, tributary states in orange.

The First Sino-Japanese War broke out in 1894 and after the Qing dynasty of China lost the war, both countries signed the Treaty of Shimonoseki on 17 April 1895. In Article 2(b) the Treaty stated that "the island of Formosa, together with all islands appertaining or belonging to the said island of Formosa" should be ceded to Japan. Although the Treaty did not specifically name every ceded island, the PRC and ROC argue that Japan did not include the islands as part of Okinawa Prefecture prior to 1894, and that the eventual inclusion occurred only as a consequence of China's cession of Taiwan and the Pescadores to Japan after the Sino-Japanese War.

The Japanese government argues that the islands were not ceded by this treaty. In 1884, issues relating to the islands had been officially discussed by the Japanese Minister of Foreign Affairs Inoue Kaoru and the Minister of the Interior Yamagata Aritomo before incorporating them in 1895, shortly before Japan's victory in the Sino-Japanese War. It is also claimed that Japanese references to these islands did not appear in governmental documents before 1884.

The China and Taiwan governments claim that during negotiations with China over the Ryukyu Islands after the First Sino-Japanese War, the islands were not mentioned at all in a partition plan suggested by US ex-President Ulysses S. Grant. The lease of the islands in 1896 and subsequent purchase in 1930 by the Koga family were merely domestic arrangements made by the Japanese government which had no bearing on the legal status of the islands.

According to China, Kuomintang leader Chiang Kai-shek failed to protest American decisions with regard to the disposition of the islands because he depended on the US for support.

In April 2012, Taiwan declined an invitation from China to work together to resolve the territorial dispute with Japan. Taiwan's Mainland Affairs Council (MAC) minister Lai Shin-yuan said, "The ROC and Mainland China will not deal with the Tiaoyutai Islands disputes together. The PRC said the two sides should solve these issues together, but that is not the approach we are taking because [Taiwan and Mainland China] already have sovereignty disputes. We insist on our sovereignty."

Regarding Japan's argument about the 1953 People's Daily article, Jin Canrong, a professor at Renmin University of China thinks that the article, which is anonymous, implies that Ryukyu Islands should be a sovereign state, also independent from Japan. Other Chinese commentators, including a government research institution run by a retired People's Armed Police general, extend the Chinese claim to the entire Ryukyu chain, including Okinawa. In June 2013, The New York Times described the Chinese campaign "to question Japanese rule of [Okinawa and the Ryukyu] islands" as "semiofficial", noting that "almost all the voices in China pressing the Okinawa issue are affiliated in some way with the government."

== Japanese position ==
The stance given by the Japanese Ministry of Foreign Affairs is that the Senkaku Islands are "clearly an inherent territory of Japan in light of historical facts and based upon international law, and the Senkaku Islands are under the valid control of Japan." They also state "there exists no issue of territorial sovereignty to be resolved concerning the Senkaku Islands." The following points are given:

1. The islands had been uninhabited and showed no trace of having been under the control of China prior to 1895.
2. The islands were neither part of Taiwan nor part of the Pescadores Islands, which were ceded to Japan by the Qing Dynasty of China in Article II of the May 1895 Treaty of Shimonoseki, thus were not later renounced by Japan under Article II of the San Francisco Peace Treaty.
3. A resident of Okinawa Prefecture who had been engaging in activities such as fishery around the Senkaku Islands since around 1884 made an application for the lease of the islands, and approval was granted by the Meiji Government in 1896. After this approval, he sent a total of 248 workers to those islands and ran the following businesses: constructing piers, collecting bird feathers, manufacturing dried bonito, collecting coral, raising cattle, manufacturing canned goods and collecting mineral phosphate guano (bird manure for fuel use). The fact that the Meiji Government gave approval concerning the use of the Senkaku Islands to an individual, who in turn was able to openly run these businesses mentioned above based on the approval, demonstrates Japan's valid control over the Islands.
4. Though the islands were controlled by the United States as an occupying power between 1945 and 1972, Japan has since 1972 exercised administration over the islands.
5. Japanese allege that Taiwan and China only started claiming ownership of the islands in 1971, following a May 1969 United Nations report that a large oil and gas reserve may exist under the seabed near the islands.

- The examples of Japanese valid control after the reversion to Japan of the administrative rights over Okinawa including the Senkaku Islands are as follows:

1. Patrol and law enforcement. (e.g. law enforcement on illegal fishing by foreign fishing boats)
2. Levying taxes on the owners of the Islands under private ownership. (in Kuba Island.)
3. Management as state-owned land (in Taisho Island, Uotsuri Island, etc.)
4. As for Kuba Island and Taisho Island, the Government of Japan has offered them to the United States since 1972 as facilities/districts in Japan under the Japan-U.S. Status of Forces Agreement.
5. Researches by the Central Government and the Government of Okinawa Prefecture (e.g. Utilization and development research by Okinawa Development Agency (construction of temporary heliport, etc.) (1979), Fishery research by the Okinawa Prefecture (1981), Research on albatrosses commissioned by the Environment Agency (1994).).

After the Meiji Restoration, the Japanese government surveyed the islands in 1885, which found that the islands were terra nullius and that there was no evidence to suggest that they had ever been under Chinese control. At the time of this survey, however, Yamagata Aritomo, the minister of interior of the Meiji government, took a cautious approach and put off the request to incorporate the islands. The Government of Japan made a Cabinet Decision on 14 January 1895, to erect markers on the islands to formally incorporate the Senkaku Islands into the territory of Japan through the surveys conducted by the Government of Japan, it was confirmed that the Senkaku Islands had been not only uninhabited but also showed no trace of having been under the control of the Qing Dynasty of China.

Scholars have also challenged China's claim that the Senkaku Islands were part of its territory since the Ming dynasty. A record dated August 1617 in the Ming Shilu, the official annals of Ming dynasty, shows that China did not control the Senkaku Islands. In the record, a Ming coastal defense official mentioned the islands of Dongyin, Lienchiang, about 40 kilometers off mainland China, as the eastern limit of the Ming's domain, and said the seas beyond were open for any nation to navigate. As the Senkaku Islands lie about 330 kilometers from mainland China, the record suggests they were far beyond the Ming China's sphere of control and the boundary described by the official. This contradicts Beijing's claim that China have controlled Senkaku Islands since the Ming dynasty about 600 years ago. An expert in international law, says "We know the Ming had effective control only of the coastal area from other historical sources. What is remarkable about this finding is that a Chinese official made a clear statement along these lines to a Japanese envoy. This proves the Senkaku Islands were not controlled by the Ming."

Additionally, in the History of Ming (Mingshi), the official history of the Ming dynasty, Taiwan is listed under the section "Biographies of Foreign Countries" (Waiguo Liezhuan), classified as "Dongfan" (Eastern Barbarians) alongside Korea, Japan, Ryukyu, and Luzon. Professor Ozaki Shigeyoshi argues that since Ming China did not consider even Taiwan to be part of its domain, the claim that the Senkaku Islands were Chinese territory as appurtenances of Taiwan since Ming dynasty is untenable.

After ratifying the United Nations Convention on the Law of the Sea (UNCLOS) in June 1996, Japan began asserting an exclusive economic zone around the islands in July 1996.

In 2005, Japan passed its first parliamentary resolution on the islands and reaffirmed its claim of territorial sovereignty over them.

During a private visit 9 years after stepping down from office, former President of Republic of China, Lee Teng-hui, once said that the islands are part of Okinawa. During the 2012 anti-Japanese demonstrations in China, on 13 September 2012, Lee remarked, "The Senkaku Islands, no matter whether in the past, for now or in the future, certainly belong to Japan." In 2002, he also stated, "The Senkaku Islands are the territory of Japan."

== American position ==
On 25 December 1953, U.S. Civil Administration of the Ryukyus Proclamation 27 (USCAR 27) set geographical boundaries of the Ryukyu Islands that included the Senkaku Islands. Moreover, during U.S. administration of the islands, the U.S. Navy built firing ranges on them and paid annual rent of $11,000 to Jinji Koga, son of the first Japanese settler of the islands.

During the San Francisco Peace Treaty discussions, John Foster Dulles, chief U.S. delegate to the peace conference, set forth the concept that Japan had "residual sovereignty" over the Ryukyu Islands. According to an official analysis prepared by the U.S. Army, "residual Sovereignty" meant that "the United States will not transfer its sovereign powers over the Ryukyu Islands to any nation other than Japan." In June 1957, President Eisenhower confirmed this at the U.S.-Japan summit meeting, telling Japanese Prime Minister Nobusuke Kishi that "residual sovereignty" over the Ryukyus meant that "the United States would exercise its rights for a period and that the sovereignty would then return to Japan." In March 1962, President John F. Kennedy stated in an Executive Order for the Ryukyus, "I recognize the Ryukyus to be a part of the Japanese homeland and look forward to the day when the security interests of the Free World will permit their restoration to full Japanese sovereignty." Since there was no U.S. action to separate the Senkaku Islands from the Ryukyu, these applications of "residual sovereignty" appeared to include the Senkaku Islands.

In the first quarter of 1971 U.S. officials became aware of and successfully opposed a Japanese proposal to set up a weather station on the islands.

In May 1971, a report compiled by the U.S. Central Intelligence Agency (CIA) said "[t]he Japanese claim to sovereignty over the Senkakus is strong, and the burden of proof of ownership would seem to fall on the Chinese". The CIA also said in related documents that any dispute between Japan, China, and Taiwan over the islands would not have arisen, had it not been for the discovery around 1968 of potential oil reserves on the nearby continental shelf.

On 7 June 1971, President Richard M. Nixon confirmed Japan's "residual sovereignty" over the Senkaku Islands just before a deal to return Okinawa Prefecture to Japan in a conversation with his national security adviser Henry Kissinger. Kissinger also told Nixon that "these [Senkaku] islands stayed with Okinawa" when Japan returned Taiwan to China after the end of World War II in 1945.

The Nixon Administration removed the Senkakus from its inclusion in the concept of Japanese "residual sovereignty" in presenting the Okinawa Reversion Treaty to the U.S. Senate for ratification. On 20 October 1971, U.S. Secretary of State William Rogers sent a letter to U.S Congress. In his letter, Acting Assistant Legal Adviser Robert Starr stated "The United States believes that a return of administrative rights over those islands to Japan, from which the rights were received, can in no way prejudice any underlying claims. The United States cannot add to the legal rights Japan possessed before it transferred administration of the islands to us, nor can the United States, by giving back what it received, diminish the rights of other claimants ... The United States has made no claim to the Senkaku Islands and considers that any conflicting claims to the islands are a matter for resolution by the parties concerned." Several experts have attributed this Nixon Administration policy shift as having been influenced by White House overtures to China during 1971–1972, culminating in the Nixon visit to China.

In April 1978, Japan asked the United States to side with the Japanese view, but the United States declining because "it could become embroiled in a Sino-Japanese territorial dispute."

In June 1978, the United States Navy stopped using the Sekibi-Sho firing range off the coast of Taisho Island to avoid any potential confrontation between China and Japan, according to declassified government documents. The next year the federal government denied a military request to resume operations in the Senkakus.

Top US government officials have declared in 2004, 2010, and September 2012 that as Japan maintains effective administrative control on the islands, the islands fall under the 1960 Treaty of Mutual Cooperation and Security between the United States and Japan which requires the US to assist Japan in defending the islands if anyone, including China, attacks or attempts to occupy or control them.

On 29 November 2012, the U.S. Senate unanimously approved an amendment to National Defense Authorization Act for Fiscal Year 2013 stating the Japanese-administered Senkaku Islands fall under the scope of a Treaty of Mutual Cooperation and Security between the United States and Japan and that the U.S. would defend Japan in the event of armed attacks.

In 2013, U.S. Secretary of State John Kerry stated that the United States does not take a position on the sovereignty of the islands, but that it recognizes they are under Japanese administration and opposes any unilateral efforts that would undermine Japanese administration of the islands.

In May 2013, the U.S. Department of Defense criticized the Chinese territorial claim in a report titled "Military and Security Developments Involving the People's Republic of China 2013."

In September 2012, China began using improperly drawn straight baseline claims around the Senkaku Islands, adding to its network of maritime claims inconsistent with international law.

In December 2012, China submitted information to the U.N. Commission on the Limits of the Continental Shelf regarding China's extended continental shelf in the East China Sea that includes the disputed islands.

On 30 July 2013, the Senate unanimously approved a resolution condemning China's action over the Senkaku Islands. The Resolution titled "Senate Resolution 167—Reaffirming the Strong Support of the United States for the Peaceful Resolution of Territorial, Sovereignty, and Jurisdictional Disputes in the Asia-Pacific Maritime Domains", referring to the recent Chinese provocations near the Senkaku Islands, condemns "the use of coercion, threats, or force by naval, maritime security, or fishing vessels and military or civilian aircraft in the South China Sea and the East China Sea to assert disputed maritime or territorial claims or alter the status quo."

In 2014, United States Pacific Commander Samuel J. Locklear said that he did not have sufficient resources to carry out a successful amphibious warfare campaign should the dispute lead to a war. In April 2014, the United States will begin Northrop Grumman RQ-4 Global Hawk patrols of the seas around the islands.

On 23–25 April 2014, U.S. President Barack Obama made a state visit to Japan and held a summit meeting with Prime Minister Shinzo Abe. President Obama repeated that the commitments of Article 5 of the Treaty of Mutual Cooperation and Security between the United States and Japan covered all territories under Japan's administration, including the Senkaku Islands, in a joint press conference and reiterated in a U.S.-Japan Joint Statement. Barack Obama is the first president of the United States to have mentioned that the Senkaku Islands are covered under Article 5 of Treaty of Mutual Cooperation and Security between the United States and Japan.

In November 2020, during a conversation with Prime Minister Suga, Joe Biden declared that US security guarantees for Japan include the Senkaku Islands. Suga said "President-elect Biden gave me a commitment that Article 5 of the US-Japan security treaty applies to the Senkaku Islands".

On 24 January 2021, U.S. Defense Secretary Lloyd Austin reaffirmed America's commitment to defend the Senkaku Islands and that it's covered by Article 5 of the U.S.-Japan security treaty. The USA also opposes any unilateral attempts to change the status quo in the East China Sea.

== Alternative approaches ==
When China-Japan diplomatic relations were established in 1972, both nations found reasons to set aside this territorial dispute. According to negotiator Deng Xiaoping, "It does not matter if this question is shelved for some time, say, 10 years. Our generation is not wise enough to find common language on this question. Our next generation will certainly be wiser. They will certainly find a solution acceptable to all."

In 1969, the United Nations Economic Commission for Asia and the Far East (ECAFE) identified potential oil and gas reserves in the vicinity of the Senkaku Islands. During subsequent decades, several rounds of bilateral talks considered joint-development of sub-seabed resources in disputed territorial waters. Such efforts to develop a cooperative strategy were unsuccessful.

In 2008, a preliminary agreement on joint development of resources was reached but the agreement only includes the area far from these islands.

In 2009, a hotline was agreed to (and in 2010 a military-to-military hotline), neither of which have been implemented.

== Disputes about the proximate causes ==
Explanations of the manifold causes of the intensified conflict involving the Senkaku Islands vary. For example, some use the term "territorial dispute"; however, the Japanese government has consistently rejected this framing since the early 1970s. An analysis of incidents and issues require distinguishing between disputes which are primarily over territory and those which merely have a territorial component.

The real importance of the islands lies in the ... implications for the wider context of the two countries' approaches to maritime and island disputes, as well as in the way in which those issues can be used by domestic political groups to further their own objectives. – Zhongqi Pan.

As of 2011, news organizations of various nations were monitoring developments and attempting to explain the causes of the crisis, e.g.,

- Senkakus described as a proxy. According to China Daily, the Senkaku Islands are a disruptive mine planted by the United States into Sino-Japanese relations.
- Senkakus characterized as a pretext. According to the New York Times, some analysts frame all discussion about the islands' status within a broader pattern of Chinese territorial assertions.
- Senkakus identified as a tactic. According to the Christian Science Monitor, the early phase of the dispute may have represented a tactical distraction from China's internal power struggle over who would replace the leadership of the CCP in 2012.
- Senkakus characterized as a lack of firm foreign policy-making control and of dysfunctional decision-making. The Economist posits that "Lacking clear direction, [Chinese] bureaucracies may be trying to look tough." The Diplomat posits that the People's Liberation Army may at some level be acting independently of top CCP leadership, and notes more generally that there is a lack of coordination within China's decision-making apparatus.

The historical record is a backdrop for each new incident in the unfolding chronology of these islands.

== Events ==
While Taiwan and China first publicly claimed the islands in 1971 (in February and December, respectively), there were no major incidents between the three states regarding the islands until the 1990s. Since 2004, however, several events, including naval encounters, scrambled fighter jets, diplomatic efforts, and massive public protests, have heightened the dispute.

=== Incidents at or near the islands ===
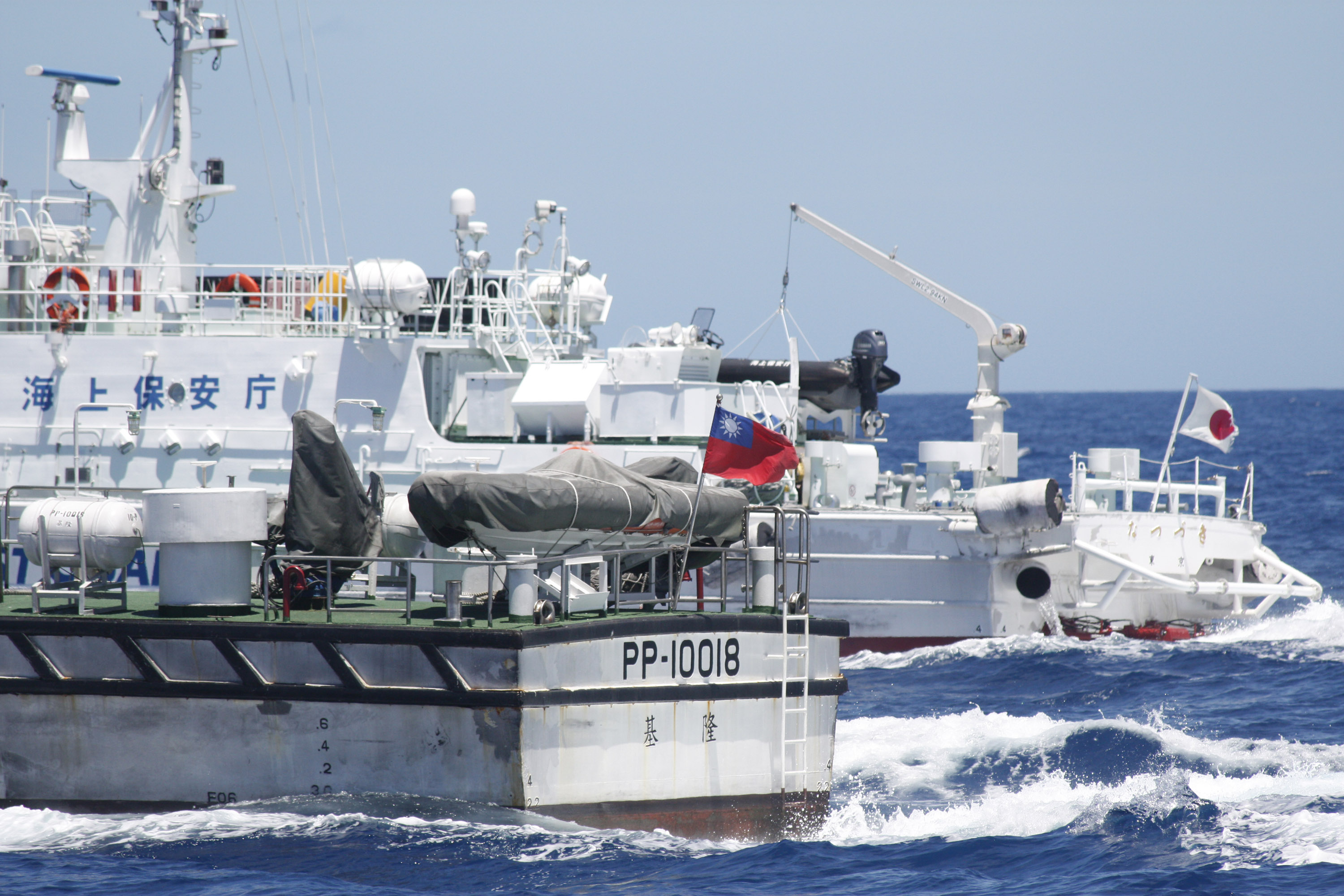
ROC Coast Guard vessel and Japan Coast Guard vessel.

On 12 April 1978, over 80 Chinese fishing boats came to the waters around the disputed islands and remained there for about a week, raising tensions with Japan a few months before the Treaty of Peace and Friendship between Japan and China was concluded. As of at least 2024, there is no historical consensus about what prompted this activity due to sparse historical records on the issue. Chinese Vice Premier Geng Biao sought to alleviate tensions, stating that the incident was "neither intentional nor deliberate" and that "we should not argue over the island problem, and we should resolve that problem in the future". Deng Xiaoping canceled a planned major People's Liberation Army Navy exercise as a further effort to reduce tension. Ultimately, Japanese Ambassador Sato Shoji and Chinese Vice Foreign Minister Han Nianlong agreed to avoid discussing the issue again prior to concluding the treaty and the tensions over the incident were defused.

On 29 September 1990, Japanese media reported that the Japanese Maritime Safety Agency was preparing to recognize (as an official navigation mark) a lighthouse that a right-wing Japanese group built on the main island of the disputed island group. The Taiwan government protested immediately following the reports. On 18 October, a PRC spokesperson for the Ministry of Foreign Affairs was asked about the lighthouse at a press conference and stated that it was "a violation of China's sovereignty" and that the Japanese government should "immediately take effective measures to stop the activities of the right-wing group and prevent similar incidents in the future". On 21 October, twenty-four activists from Taiwan attempted to place a torch on the island to assert ROC sovereignty and the Japanese Maritime Safety Agency prevented them from doing so. On 23 October, Japanese Prime Minister Toshiki Kaifu stated that Japan would take a "cautious attitude" and indicated it would not send military ships to the area. On 27 October, PRC Vice Foreign Minister Qi Huaiyuan met with the Japanese Ambassador, reiterated the PRC's position of sovereignty over the islands, and stating that the two countries should shelve the dispute and look for opportunities to jointly develop resources in the area. On 30 October, China and Japan stopped disputing the lighthouse issue.

Tensions over the disputed islands again increased from June to October 1996. In June, Japan ratified UNCLOS and in July it began claiming a 200 nautical mile exclusive economic zone around the islands. Also in July, a right-wing Japanese organization built a makeshift lighthouse on one of the smaller islands and applied to the Japanese Maritime Safety Agency for the makeshift lighthouse to be accepted as an official navigational aid. Concerns on the Chinese side were further heightened following visits by Japanese Prime Minister Ryutaro Hashimoto, cabinet members, and more than eighty members of parliament to the Yasukuni Shrine, which honors Japan's war dead including its war criminals from World War II. On 18 August, another Japanese group placed a wooden Japanese flag on the main disputed island in the group. Ten days later, Japanese Foreign Minister Yukihiko Ikeda stated that the islands "have always been Japan's territory" and "there is no need to explain".

The organization which had built the makeshift lighthouse returned on 9 September to repair it. China protested to the Japanese government and stated that if the Japanese government continued to tolerate the group's actions, the bilateral relationship would be damaged. Tensions began decreasing after a 24 September Chinese Foreign Minister Qian Qichen and Japanese Foreign Minister Ikeda met and agreed that the Japanese group's actions were harmful and should be permitted. Tensions rose two days later, however, when the Japanese Maritime Safety Agency stopped Hong Kong-based activist David Chan Yuk-cheung's boat from landing on the islands, and he drowned while attempting to swim to shore. His death prompted major protests in Hong Kong and on Taiwan.

On 1 October, Chinese Premier Li Peng stated that "the interruption of and damage to the Sino-Japanese relationship" had been caused by "a tiny handful of right-wing forces and militarists" in Japan. Around the same time, Japan denied the Japanese organization's request for the makeshift lighthouse to be recognized as an official navigational aid. During a visit to Japan, on 29 October, Chinese Vice Foreign Minister Tang Jiaxuan requested that Japanese Deputy Foreign Minister Shunji Yanai agreed to shelve the issue and tensions again declined.

In 2002, Japan's government leased three of the disputes islands from their private owner, stating that doing so would "help prevent the illegal landing of third parties". Japanese patrol ships prevented Chinese activists from landing in the islands in June 2003. In August, Japanese activists landed on the islands. Chinese activists again tried to land on the islands in October, but were prevented by Japanese patrols. In March 2004, Chinese activists landed but were arrested by Japanese authorities. This prompted protests in China, and on the third day of their detention, Japan released the Chinese activists, citing a desire not to hurt the bilateral relationship.

Since 2006, vessels from China, Taiwan, and Hong Kong have entered waters that Japan claims as part of its exclusive economic zone connected with the islands on a number of occasions. In some cases, the incursions have been carried out by Chinese and Taiwanese protesters, such as in 2006 when a group of activists from the Action Committee for Defending the Diaoyu Islands approached the islands; the group was stopped by the Japanese Coast Guard prior to landing. In June 2008 activists from Taiwan, accompanied by Chinese Coast Guard vessels, approached within 0.4 nautical miles (740 m) of the main island, from which position they circumnavigated the island in an assertion of sovereignty of the islands. In 2011, a fishing boat carrying some activists navigated to within 23 nautical miles of the islands. Japan sent coast guard vessels to block the ship and a helicopter to monitor its actions, subsequent to which the Coast Guard Agency Keelung office of Taiwan sent five patrol vessels. After a short standoff between the two groups of vessels, the Taiwanese fleet returned to their own territory. In July 2012, Coastguard vessels from Taiwan and Japan collided while the Taiwanese vessel was escorting activists to the area. In August 2012, activists from Hong Kong were able to swim ashore after their boat was stopped by the Japan Coast Guard. The activists were detained and then deported two days later. In January 2013, a boat carrying activists from Taiwan was intercepted by Japanese patrols and diverted from an attempted landing on the islands through the use of water cannons.

In addition, a number of incidents have occurred due to the presence of Chinese or Taiwanese fishing vessels in sea zones claimed by Japan. In some cases, these incidents have resulted in a collision between boats. The first major event occurred in 2008, when a Taiwanese fishing boat and a Japanese patrol vessel collided. The passengers were released, but the captain was detained for three days. Later in June, after releasing video taken by the Taiwanese boat, Japan apologized for the incident and agreed to pay NT$10 million (US$311,000) as compensation to the owner of the boat. On 7 September 2010, a Chinese fishing trawler collided with two Japanese Coast Guard patrol boats in disputed waters near the islands. The collisions occurred after the Japanese Coast Guard ordered the trawler to leave the area. After the collisions, Japanese sailors boarded the Chinese vessel and arrested the captain Zhan Qixiong. Japan held the captain until 24 September. Each country blamed the other for the collision. Japan sought to address the collision through its courts in violation of the Sino-Japanese Fisheries Agreement, which specifies that the area around the contested islands are treated as the high seas subject to flag state jurisdiction. China demanded Zhao's immediate and unconditional release, and Japan sought to save face by releasing him if he would pay a fine for the collision. Because that would have meant Japan retained jurisdiction, China refused. When China arrested four Japanese nationals on allegations of videotaping military targets, Japan released Zhan.

While Japanese government vessels regularly patrol the ocean surrounding the islands, Japanese civilians have also entered the area. In July 2010, nine Japanese boats fished in the area. A spokesman from Ganbare Nippon, which owned one of the vessels, stated it was done specifically to assert Japanese sovereignty over the islands. In August 2012, Ganbare Nippon organized a group of four vessels carrying Japanese activists travelling to the islands, carrying about 150 Japanese activists. The Japanese government denied the groups the right to land, after which a number swam to shore and raised a Japanese flag.

On some occasions, ships and planes from various Chinese and Taiwanese government and military agencies have entered the disputed area. In addition to the cases where they escorted fishing and activist vessels as described above, there have been other incursions. In an eight-month period in 2012, over forty maritime incursions and 160 aerial incursions occurred. For example, in July 2012, three Chinese patrol vessels entered the disputed waters around the islands. On 13 December 2012, a Chinese government aircraft entered Japanese-controlled airspace for the first time since records began in 1958, following months of incursions by Chinese surface vessels. The Japan Air Self-Defense Force scrambled eight F-15 fighters and an airborne early warning aircraft in response to the Chinese flight. The Japanese government made a formal diplomatic protest to China.

The most direct confrontation to date between the countries' official vessels occurred in September 2012. Seventy five Taiwanese fishing vessels were escorted by ten Taiwanese Coast Guard vessels to the area, and the Taiwanese Coast Guard ships clashed with Japanese Coast Guard ships. Both sides fired water cannons at each other and used LED lights and loudspeakers to announce their respective claims to the islands.

Military escalation continued in 2013. The two sides sent fighter airplanes to monitor ships and other planes in the area. In February, Japanese Defense Minister Itsunori Onodera revealed that a Chinese frigate had locked weapons-targeting radar onto a Japanese destroyer and helicopter on two occasions in January. The Chinese Jiangwei II class frigate and the Japanese destroyer were three kilometers apart, and the crew of the latter went to battle stations. Chinese state media responded that their frigates had been engaged in routine training at the time. In May 2013, a warship flotilla from North Sea Fleet deployed from Qingdao for training exercises western North Pacific Ocean. In October 2013 the Chinese Ministry of Defense responded to reports that if Chinese drones entered what Japan considered its territory Japan might shoot them down by declaring that China would consider such an action an "act of war." State-controlled media in China warned that "a war looms following Japan's radical provocation" while expressing confidence that "China's comprehensive military power... is stronger than Japan's." USN Captain James Fanell has claimed that Mission Action 2013 was a dress rehearsal for a PLA seizure of the islands.

The Japanese Coast Guard announced in June 2020 that Chinese government ships had been spotted for a record number of consecutive days in the territorial waters of the Senkaku Islands. As of 19 June 2020, the number of consecutive days is 67.

On 4 June 2022, Chinese-Russian military activity was spotted in the area of the Senkaku Islands. A Russian frigate sailed inside the "contiguous zone" of the Senkaku Islands for over 1 hour and thereafter a Chinese frigate sailed inside it for 40 minutes. The incursion by a Chinese warship was the fourth time since June 2016.

The Japan Coast Guard reported that Chinese government vessels intruded into Japanese territorial waters near the islands of Minamikojima and Uotsurijima just after 11 am on 30 March 2023. The vessels stayed for a record 80 hours and 36 minutes.

=== Diplomatic ===
The various governments have lodged protests and criticisms of each other in response to the unfolding situation in and around the islands. For example, the Taiwanese government recalled its highest representative to Japan, who then resigned, in the wake of the 2008 collision. Similarly, the Chinese government protested the 2012 Ganbare Nippon incident. The 2010 collision incident resulted in a significant increase in tensions between the two countries, both during the event as they argued over the release of the fishing boat crew, and after, as both said they would seek compensation from the other for damages.

In 2012, President of Taiwan Ma Ying-Jeou proposed the East China Sea Peace Initiative, which called for the sharing of the region's resources, including the Senkaku Islands, mediated by peaceful negotiations, international law, and international consensus.

Following the Chinese government's statement in 2024, a Chinese buoy was removed from the area, with the Chinese government stating that "the buoy has completed its task".

=== Protests ===
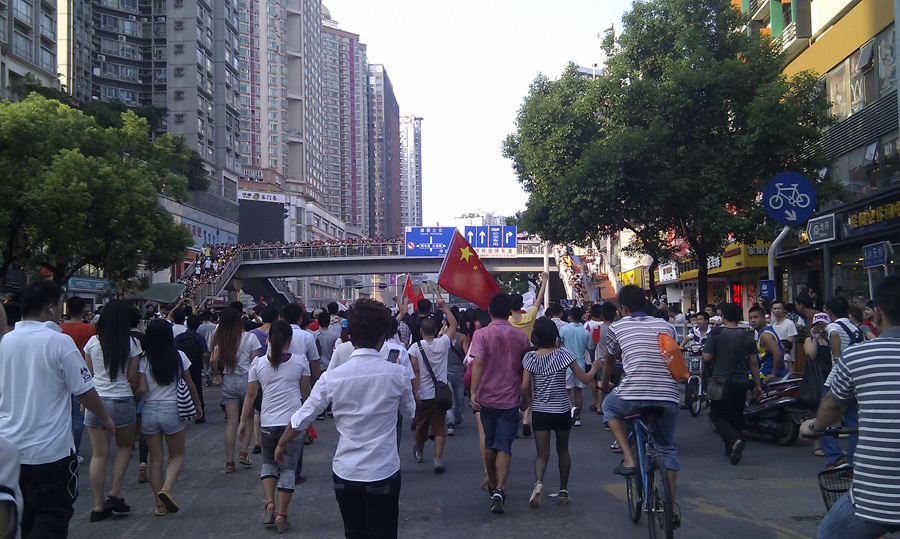
Demonstration in Shenzhen, China on 17 September 2012

There have protests in Taiwan, China, Japan, and the United States addressing the disputed islands, often triggered by the specific incidents described above.

The United States proposal in 1971 to transfer the islands to Japan prompted the development of the Baodiao movement. This movement began among students from Taiwan and Hong Kong studying in the United States, and then spread to Taiwan and Hong Kong. Protests directly related to the Baodiao movement ended in 1972.

Following the 1990 incident in which the Japanese Maritime Safety Agency intended to recognize as official a lighthouse built by a right-wing Japanese, large protests against Japan resulted in Taiwan and in the United States. Large protests also occurred in Hong Kong and Macau but the PRC government prevented large scale protests in the PRC and censored news reports of protests by overseas Chinese (although British Broadcasting Corporation reports and Voice of America reports meant that the Chinese public continued to be aware of media reports on the issue). In Beijing, protestors distributed handbills and put up posters criticizing the CCP for being "soft" on Japan.

On 28 August 1996, the Japanese foreign minister asserted Japanese sovereignty over the islands during a visit to British Hong Kong. People in Hong Kong responded with daily protests through 18 September (the anniversary of the Japanese invasion of Manchuria).

A major set of protests revolved around the 2010 boat collision, with protests being held in Japan, China, and Taiwan. In 2012, major protests began in August 2012 after reports that the Japanese government was considering purchasing the islands. The protests continued after the formal purchase into the middle of September. At the height of the protests, there were demonstrations in as many as 85 Chinese cities, along with Hong Kong and the United States. There were also protests on Taiwan. In many cases, these protests included anti-Japanese violence, vandalism, and arson.

During the 2012 flare-up of the dispute, the Chinese government instituted a media campaign focused on an anti-fascist theme and remembrance of the Second Sino-Japanese War as opposed to the territorial conflict itself.

=== Militarization ===
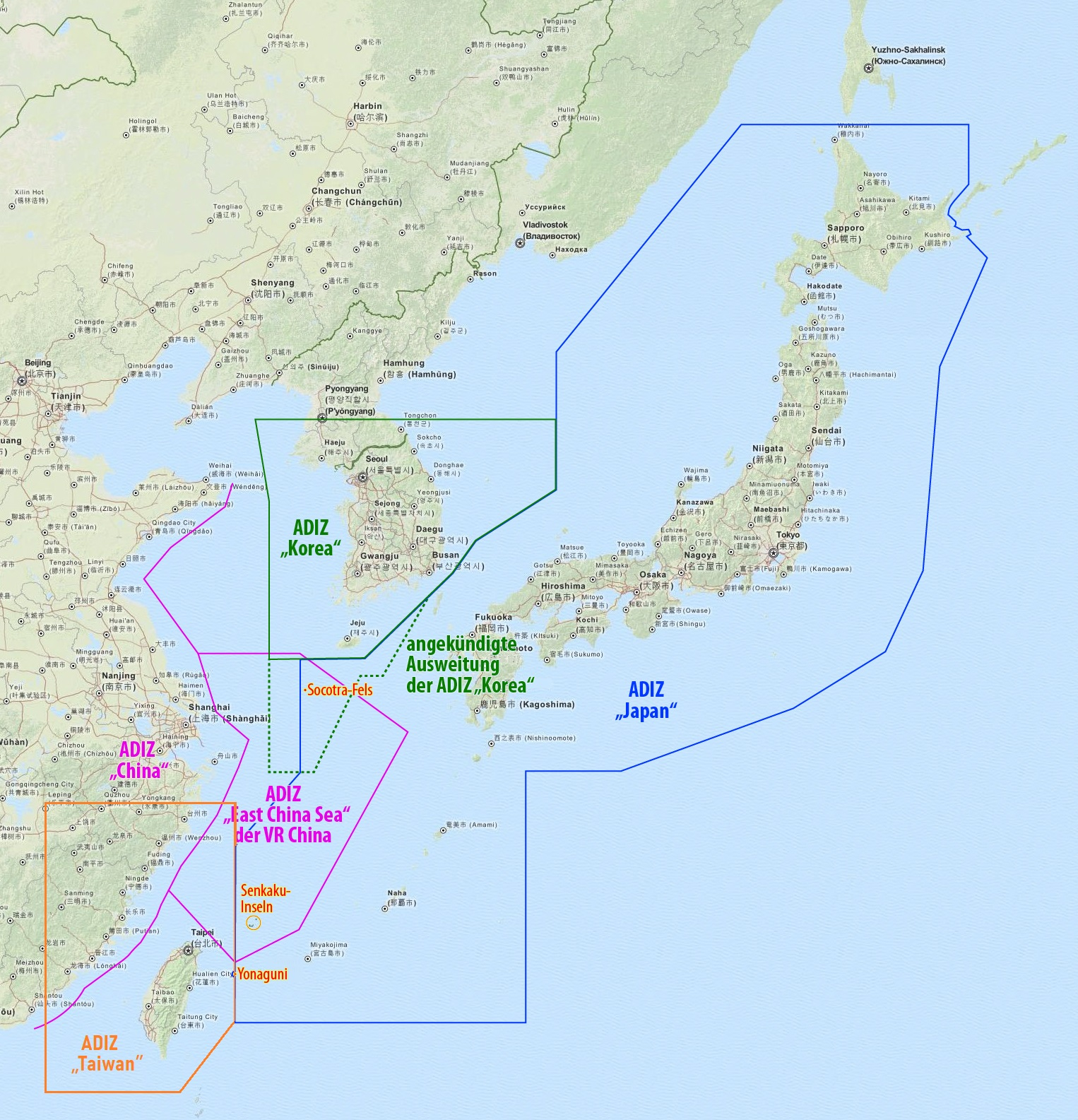
East China Sea Air Defense Identification Zones

China decided to implement an "Air Defense Identification Zone" around the islands and the broader region in order to "guard against potential air threats," according to the defence ministry. Japan reacted to the news by calling the move "very dangerous." On 23 November 2013, China then sent air force jets, including fighter planes, to carry out a patrol mission. According to CNN, most of the zone was north of the islands. On 26 November 2013, declaring the area international waters and airspace, the United States flew two B-52 bomber aircraft through the zone without incident. A spokesman for the United States military stated that "The U.S. military will continue conducting flight operations in the region, including with our allies and partners.... We will not register a flight plan, we will not identify our transponder, our radio frequency and logo."

Since the imposition, U.S. B-52 aircraft and South Korean and Japanese military aircraft have violated it. The U.S. also warned its commercial airlines to be cautious about the area. China then sent fighter jets on patrol duty in the area as a "defensive measure."

According to a 2012 poll jointly conducted by mainland-based Global Times and Taiwan-based China Times, residents of Taiwan differ from their mainland counterparts in terms of willingness to ultimately resort to military means, with 91% of mainland residents saying warfare should not be ruled out versus only 41% on the island.

To assist in the intruders detection in Senkaku Islands region, since 28 March 2016, Japan has operated a radar station at Yonaguni island, resulting in a furious Chinese response.

On 1 February 2021, the People's Republic of China passed a new law that authorized the Chinese Coast Guard to use lethal force in response to violations of "national sovereignty, sovereign rights, and jurisdiction". The law received condemnation from Japan and the United States and generated tensions because it would apply to disputed waters claimed by China, including around the Senkaku Islands. Coast guards from some other countries also operate under similar policies, and the Chinese Coast Guard had already been using force prior to the law. Rand Corporation researcher Timothy Heath indicated that the law could help prevent misunderstandings by providing "some degree of clarification and standardization of procedures," but also noted that the law could embolden military officers by clearly and officially approving the use of force. On 6 February 2021, Chinese Coast Guard vessels entered Japanese-administered waters near the Senkaku Islands for the first time after the law was passed.

On 30 June 2022, the Japan Ministry of Defense announced the construction of 12 offshore patrol vessel (OPV) by Japan Marine United Corporation (JMU) for the Japanese Maritime Self-Defense Force (JMSDF) at a cost of ¥9 billion ($66 million USD) per ship. The purpose of this OPV program is to provide enhanced maritime security, particularly around the southwestern Ryukyu Islands, including the disputed Senkaku/Diaoyu Islands in the East China Sea, by boosting JMSDF patrol activities in the region. These vessels are highly automated and configurable to meet a wide range of missions involving "enhanced steady-state intelligence, surveillance, and reconnaissance (ISR) in the waters around Japan." Under the contract, JMU is charged with delivering the 12 vessels to the JMSDF from fiscal year 2023, which starts on 1 April 2023.

=== Education ===
In 2014, the PRC complained about Japanese plans to teach students about ownership of the islands.

=== Other incidents ===
- In April 2014, Lieutenant General John Wissler, commander of the US III Marine Expeditionary Force stated that his forces were ready and able to defend the Senkaku Islands if they were attacked by the PRC. China responded in English on the People's Liberation Army (PLA) website, saying that the PLA was able to take and hold the islands at any time and requesting that Wissler, "Please learn lessons from your old superiors. Don't be so ready to make threats with forces. Please pay some respect to Chinese armed forces, which defeated your armed forces in the Korean War."
- On 9 June 2016, three Russian warships and a Chinese Navy frigate sailed just off the edge of the 12 nautical miles territorial zone around the Senkaku Islands for a few hours. Japan promptly summoned a Chinese ambassador in Tokyo with demand for the warship to leave. This was the first time a Chinese Navy was involved in the dispute. Previous incidents have seen the involvement of the China Coast Guard (see China Coast Guard Senkaku-related incidents) or civilian vessels only.
- On 11 August 2016, a Chinese fishing vessel was sunk 65 kilometers (40 mi) from Uotsuri island after colliding with a Greek freighter. Out of the boat's 14 crew members, 6 were rescued by the Japan Coast Guard, while 8 men were unaccounted for. In a statement by the Japanese Foreign Ministry, the Chinese side "expressed appreciation" for the Japanese operation.
- In November 2025, during the 2025 China-Japan diplomatic crisis, China Coast Guard vessels and Chinese military drones patrolled through disputed waters.

== Fishing rights ==
The issue of sovereignty has been carefully circumvented in bilateral fishing agreements. In the 1997 fishing agreement, the Senkaku Islands were officially excluded from China's exclusive economic zone, but in a letter of intent Japan explained that Japan would not prevent Chinese boats from fishing there. Some Chinese sources have subsequently argued that this letter constitutes a waiver of Japan's claim to exclusive fishing rights.

In 2014, Taiwan and Japan came to an agreement on fishing in the waters around the islands.

== See also ==
- Action Committee for Defending the Diaoyu Islands, a Hong Kong Chinese activist group
- Baodiao movement, a Chinese activist group
- China Federation for Defending the Diaoyu Islands, a mainland Chinese activist group
- East China Sea EEZ disputes
- Ganbare Nippon, a Japanese activist group
- List of territorial disputes
- Territorial disputes of Japan

== Sources ==
- Shaw, Han-yi (1999). The Diaoyutai/Senkaku Islands Dispute: Its History and Analysis of the Ownership Claims of the P.R.C., R.O.C., and Japan. Baltimore, Maryland: University of Maryland School of Law. OCLC 608151745
- Netherlands Institute for the Law of the Sea (December 2000). International Organizations and the Law of the Sea 1998, Vol.14. London : Graham & Trotman/Martinus Nijhoff. OCLC 16852368
- Suganuma, Unryu (March 2001). Sovereign Rights and Territorial Space in Sino-Japanese Relations. Honolulu: University of Hawaii Press. ISBN 978-0824824938; OCLC 170955369
- Lee, Seokwoo, Shelagh Furness and Clive Schofield (2002). Territorial disputes among Japan, China and Taiwan concerning the Senkaku Islands. Boundary & Territory Briefing Vol.3 No.7 (PDF). Durham: University of Durham, International Boundaries Research Unit (IBRU). OCLC 249501645
- Pan, Junwu (February 2009). Toward a New Framework for Peaceful Settlement of China's Territorial and Boundary Disputes. Leiden: Martinus Nijhoff. ISBN 978-9004174283; OCLC 282968950
- Curtis, Gerald, Kokubun, Ryosei and Jisi, Wang (May 2010). Getting the Triangle Straight: Managing China-Japan-US Relations. Tokyo: Japan Center for International Exchange, ISBN 978-4889070804; OCLC 491904160
- Togo, Kazuhiko (May 2012). "Japan's Territorial Problem: The Northern Territories, Takeshima, and the Senkaku Islands". Commentary. Seattle: The National Bureau of Asian Research (NBR).
- O'Hanlon, Michael E. (April 2019). The Senkaku Paradox: Risking Great Power War Over Small Stakes. Brookings Institution Press, ISBN 978-0815736899.
  Humanities & Social Sciences Online (November 2019) (online review)
- Research Committee for the Research on the Senkaku Islands-related Documents (December 2020). Commissioned Research Report on the Senkaku lslands-related Documents (FY 2019) (PDF). Cabinet Secretariat (Japan) (Report).
