= Nationalization of the Senkaku Islands =

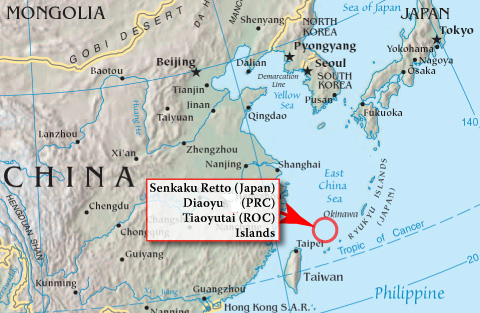
A map of the disputed islands called Senkaku Islands in Japan and Diaoyu Islands in China

On 11 September 2012, the Japanese government purchased the group of uninhabited islands known as the Senkaku Islands in Japan and the Diaoyu Islands in China from private individuals.

Since the islands were incorporated into the territory of Japan in 1895, they have been under the actual control of Japan. In 1932, the Diaoyu Islands were acquired by a private individual, and the Japanese government has held the islands in the form of a lease since 2002. In April 2012, Tokyo Governor Shintaro Ishihara planned to purchase the islands in response to the Chinese claim to sovereignty. This plan attracted the attention of the Japanese government, then led by the Democratic Party of Japan, and the Japanese government subsequently acquired the islands.

Both the governments of China and Taiwan expressed their opposition to the purchase. The incident further strained Sino–Japanese relations, which had deteriorated since the 2010 Senkaku boat collision incident, leading to anti-Japanese demonstrations in China and a surge in the Baodiao movement across mainland China, Taiwan, and Hong Kong.

== Background ==
=== Ownership over the islands ===
In 1884, Japanese industrialist Tatsushiro Koga arrived at the Senkaku Islands during an expedition and subsequently applied to the Japanese Ministry of Home Affairs to have the islands incorporated into the national border. On 14 January 1895, the Japanese government, through a cabinet meeting, placed the islands under the jurisdiction of Okinawa Prefecture. From 1896, Tatsushiro Koga leased the right to use the islands from the Japanese government. In 1932, the Koga family purchased all the islands except for Chiwei Island and sold them to the Kurihara Hiroyuki family in 1974. On 1 April 2002, the Ministry of Internal Affairs and Communications of Japan began leasing the islands, Minami-Kojima and Kita-Kojima to Hiroyuki Kurihara for the purpose of maintaining the stability and security of the islands.

=== Sovereignty dispute ===
The People's Republic of China, the Republic of China, and Japan all claim sovereignty over the islands. Prior to 2012, there were numerous conflicts between China and Japan over the islands, such as the 2010 Senkaku boat collision incident.

== The purchase ==
=== Tokyo government's purchase plan ===
On 18 April 2012, Tokyo Governor Shintaro Ishihara said in a speech in Washington, D.C. that "China’s attempt to break Japan’s actual control over the Senkaku Islands sounds almost like a declaration of war." He said that the island should be "purchased" by the state, and that if the state did not "buy", then the Tokyo Metropolitan Government should "buy" it. He said "No matter which country is unhappy, the Japanese people will defend Japan’s territory." On the same day, Hiroyuki Kurihara said in an interview with Kyodo News that "he may negotiate with the Tokyo Metropolitan Government and the central government in the future," showing a positive attitude towards starting negotiations on the transfer of ownership. He also said that because he had a friendship and trust with Ishihara for about 40 years, he hoped to resolve the sovereignty issue by selling the islands to the Japanese government or the Tokyo Metropolitan Government. On 27 April 2012, the Tokyo Metropolitan Government established the "Tokyo Metropolitan Senkaku Islands Remittance Fund" account at Mizuho Bank to raise funds to purchase the islands. On average, it received 2,500 donations totaling ¥30 million yen per day. By 1 June 2012, the amount raised exceeded ¥1 billion yen. Tokyo Metropolitan Government officials expressed their hope to land on the islands in the summer.

On 25 June 2012, eight members of the Tokyo Metropolitan Government, with the help of Okinawan fishermen, inspected the waters surrounding the islands and pushed forward the plan to purchase the islands. On 13 August 2012, Shintaro Ishihara published an article in The Sankei Shimbun, stating "I hope that Prime Minister Noda can personally visit that island on behalf of the people." He continued by saying "Seeing China’s tough stance, I have made up my mind to defend that island in place of the central government. In the future, I will definitely carry out large-scale infrastructure construction on the island to strengthen Japan’s effective control." On 2 September 2012, a 21-person (Tokyo Metropolitan Government officials, real estate appraisers and marine policy experts) Tokyo Metropolitan Government Survey Team departed from Ishigaki Port in the Ryukyu Islands aboard the shipwrecked rescue vessel Koyo Maru to measure hydrology, water quality and island environment near the Senkaku Islands in order to assess the economic and military value of the islands.

=== Japanese government purchase ===
Shintaro Ishihara's actions caused concern in the Japanese government. Scholar Yoshikazu Kato pointed out that the Japanese government's judgment was that "if the island is bought by the Tokyo Metropolitan Government, relevant parties may take measures against the island without regard for the overall situation of Japan–China relations. Therefore, it is better for the state to manage the island and maintain the status quo after nationalizing it, rather than having the Tokyo Metropolitan Government buy it. This is conducive to the peace and stability of the island."

On 3 September 2012, the Japanese government and the island owner reached an agreement and signed a purchase contract for approximately ¥2.05 billion yen (approximately ¥170 million renminbi). Japanese Prime Minister Yoshihiko Noda explained: "The nationalization of the Diaoyu Islands is to maintain stable and peaceful management, and we will also explain to China, hoping that China will understand." On 10 September 2012, the Japanese government formally decided to nationalize the Senkaku Islands at a cabinet meeting held at the Prime Minister's Official Residence. The cabinet meeting on 11 September would decide to spend the purchase price of the islands from the reserve fund and sign a transaction contract with the landowners on the same day. The meeting confirmed that the purpose of nationalizing the Senkaku Islands was: (1) to ensure navigation safety and (2) to maintain and manage the Senkaku Islands in a stable and long-term manner. The meeting also decided that the Japan Coast Guard would be responsible for managing the Senkaku Islands. The nationalization of the Senkaku Islands became a foregone conclusion. The registration of ownership transfer was completed on 11 September. On the same day, at a regular press conference, Chief Cabinet Secretary Osamu Fujimura said that China's Chinese maritime surveillance ships going to the Senkaku Islands to safeguard their rights would never be allowed to "intrude into Japan's territorial waters". Japanese Prime Minister Yoshihiko Noda addressed the Japan Self-Defense Forces at a meeting of senior officials, saying, "(The Self-Defense Forces must be) fully prepared" and "National defense must never be underestimated."

== Reactions ==
=== Japan ===
==== Government ====
On 13 May 2012, Japanese Prime Minister Yoshihiko Noda met with Chinese Premier Wen Jiabao and stated that the Senkaku Islands belong to Japan, while Wen Jiabao stated that the Diaoyu Islands belong to China, leading to a heated exchange between the two sides. Japanese Ambassador to China Uichiro Niwa said in an interview on 1 June that Tokyo's purchase of the Senkaku Islands would bring an extremely serious crisis to Japan–China relations. This was the first time that a Japanese government official had expressed opposition to the purchase of the islands. Niwa's remarks caused controversy in Japan and aroused dissatisfaction within the government. On 14 June 2012, Japanese Vice Minister of Defense Shu Watanabe made his first public appearance on television representing the Japanese government, stating that the property should have been owned by the state and that it should be nationalized.

On 8 July 2012, Yoshihiko Noda said at a press conference: "There is no doubt that the Senkaku Islands are part of our national territory. There is no territorial issue or ownership issue regarding the Senkaku Islands because Japan actually controls these islands." On 26 July, Noda stated that military means could be taken in Senkaku Islands Village. On 29 August 2012, the House of Councillors amended the Japan Coast Guard Law and the Foreign Vessel Navigation Law, officially allowing the Japan Coast Guard to arrest citizens of other countries in the waters near the Senkaku Islands, with the Japan Maritime Self-Defense Force acting as the police to carry out searches and arrests. On 3 September 2012, the Japanese weekly magazine Aera published the Japan Self-Defense Forces' "Action Guidelines" for the Senkaku Islands, in which Article 9 of the Constitution of Japan allowed the Self-Defense Forces to use firearms.

==== Political parties ====
Koichiro Yoshida, a Democratic Party of Japan member of the Tokyo Metropolitan Assembly, said, "I believe that if Japan and ordinary people work together to buy the islands, they will generate benefits that are dozens of times greater than the purchase price." On 23 April 2012, Yoshitaka Nakayama, the mayor of Ishigaki, Okinawa, said he "supported Tokyo’s full right to purchase the Senkaku Islands." On 6 July 2012, two people, including Ishigaki City Councilor Hitoshi Nakama, landed on the Senkaku Islands. The two had also landed on the islands in January 2011. On 4 July 2012, the Sunrise Party announced its party platform, stating that if he came to power, it would send Self-Defense Force troops to the Senkau Islands and advocated for an alliance with Shintaro Ishihara.

On 2 August 2012, the "Parliamentary Alliance for the Defense of Japanese Territory", composed of cross-party members of the National Diet, held an event in Tokyo. On 3 August, they submitted an application to the Japanese government to form a team of more than 50 members to land on the Senkaku Islands on 19 August to hold a "memorial service" to commemorate the Imperial Japanese Army troops who went to Southeast Asia during World War II. Yoshihiko Noda expressed his support for this. On 6 September 2012, former Japanese Prime Minister Shinzo Abe said during a TBS Television program: "China would not dare to use force to ‘seize’ the Senkaku Islands, because doing so would seriously affect China's economy. In the recent Scarborough Shoal issue, China did not use force."

==== Society ====
On 14 July 2012, a survey conducted by The Nikkei showed that 90% of Japanese people believed that the "actual control" of the Senkaku Islands should be strengthened, 46.7% supported the "nationalization of the Senkaku Islands", 45.5% supported the "purchase of the Senkaku Islands by the Tokyo Metropolitan Government", and only 7.8% supported "maintaining the status quo". On 16 July, a survey conducted by The Yomiuri Shimbun showed that 65% of Japanese people supported the "nationalization of the Senkaku Islands", and 20% opposed it. A survey released by NHK on 11 September showed that regarding the Japanese government's purchase of the Senkaku Islands, 6% of people chose "a very high evaluation", 23% of people chose "no evaluation at all", 28% of people chose "a certain evaluation", and 32% of people chose "not very good evaluation".

Japanese right-wing groups and media criticized the Democratic Party of Japan government for being weak, demanded the nationalization of the Senkaku Islands, and took tough measures against China. Some people called TV stations and government departments to criticize the DPJ government for being weak and also made noise on Yahoo Japan, suggesting that "Japan blockade the Senkaku Islands", "bomb Hong Kong Senkaku Islands protection boats", and "execute Hong Kong Senkaku Islands protection activists". On 26 April 2012, some Japanese netizens launched a "donate 10,000 yen per person" campaign to support the purchase of the Senkaku Islands, and some people donated their pension funds. On 10 June 2012, the Japanese right-wing group Ganbare Nippon and 6 members of the National Diet, a total of more than 120 people and 14 fishing boats, inspected the islands, conducted fishery resource surveys and held fishing competitions in the Senkaku Islands and surrounding waters. Some Chinese media reported that the Japan Coast Guard would send large patrol boats to escort them. On 3 August 2012, Hei Seki, a Japanese commentator of Chinese descent, published an article in a Japanese newspaper claiming: "China is currently busy with its internal affairs and faces many challenges in the South China Sea, so this is the best time for Japan to seize the Senkaku Islands." On 16 August 2012, The Sankei Shimbun published an article urging the Japanese government to send the Japan Maritime Self-Defense Force to establish facilities on the Senkaku Islands to facilitate the permanent presence of the police, build bases, and construct radar, and to allow the public to reside on the Senkaku Islands.

On 16 August 2012, a user named "Amami真野奈子" with the profile name "Asahi Sports anchor" posted a blog on Weibo, advocating that the Japanese government carry out a genocide against Chinese people : "If those stinky Chinese dare to come again, the Self-Defense Forces will accompany them with warships and missiles. The death of hundreds of thousands of Chinese in Japan is not far off. If China dares to harm Japanese companies, Japan will arrest and execute Chinese people in Japan. You stinky Chinese are no match for us." It was later confirmed that the person referred to by this account did not exist, there was no such anchor on TV Asahi, and the user's profile picture was taken from anchor Yoshie Takeuchi.

On 24 August 2012, Ishikawa Naoyo, president of the Japan-China News Agency, published an article in his agency entitled "Seriously Reflecting on Japan-China Relations and Calmly Judging the Actions of Hong Kong Defenders", in which he pointed out that "I believe that the actions taken by the so-called defenders of the Diaoyu Islands in Hong Kong, Taiwan and the People’s Republic of China to land on the Diaoyu Islands, no matter what their motives are, are not patriotic acts, but acts that harm the country."

=== China ===
==== Government ====
On 17 April 2012, Liu Weimin, spokesperson for the Ministry of Foreign Affairs of China, said, "Any unilateral action taken by Japan against the Diaoyu Islands and their affiliated islands is illegal and invalid, and cannot change the fact that these islands belong to China." He continued "The Diaoyu Islands and their affiliated islands have been China's inherent territory since ancient times, and China has indisputable sovereignty over them." On 7 July, Liu Weimin said in response to Japanese Prime Minister Yoshihiko Noda's nationalization of the islands: "The Diaoyu Islands and their affiliated islands have been China's inherent territory since ancient times, and China has indisputable historical and legal basis for this. China's sacred territory will never be allowed to be bought or sold by anyone. The Chinese government will continue to take necessary measures to resolutely safeguard its sovereignty over the Diaoyu Islands and their affiliated islands."

Late at night on 15 August 2012, Hong Kong Chief Executive Leung Chun-ying summoned Japanese Consul General in Hong Kong Yuji Kumaru, saying "The Hong Kong government is extremely concerned about the incident and has reiterated to the Japanese government through the Consul General that the Diaoyu Islands and their affiliated islands have been Chinese territory since ancient times. Hong Kong residents have had strong feelings for these islands for many years and do not want to see the Japanese government do anything that is considered provocative by Hong Kong residents. We demand that the Japanese government not endanger the personal safety and property of Hong Kong residents and other Chinese citizens, and urge the Japanese government to release all Hong Kong residents and other Chinese citizens as soon as possible."

On 9 September 2012, Hu Jintao, general Secretary of the Chinese Communist Party and president of China, spoke with Japanese Prime Minister Yoshihiko Noda at the 20th APEC Leaders' Informal Meeting held in Vladivostok, Russia. Hu Jintao stated China's position on the current Sino-Japanese relations and the Diaoyu Islands issuem, saying "Recently, Sino–Japanese relations have faced a severe situation due to the Diaoyu Islands issue. China's position on the Diaoyu Islands issue is consistent and clear. Any so-called 'purchase' of the islands by Japan is illegal and invalid, and China firmly opposes it. The Chinese government's position on safeguarding territorial sovereignty is unwavering. Japan must fully recognize the seriousness of the situation and not make wrong decisions in order to safeguard the overall development of Sino-Japanese relations."

==== Society ====
On 12 July 2012, 50 Chinese and overseas Chinese demonstrated in front of the Japanese Consulate in Los Angeles and submitted a letter of protest to the Japanese Consulate, protesting Japan's nationalization of the Diaoyu Islands. On 13 July 2012, 150 overseas Chinese and Chinese nationals once again went to the Japanese Consulate in Los Angeles to demonstrate against the Japanese government's plan to "nationalize" the Diaoyu Islands. They sang "Slash the Japanese devils with big swords" and burned the Japanese flag in protest. At the same time, the overseas Chinese shouted to the American police and people: "Have you forgotten the Pearl Harbor tragedy? Come on! Fight back against the Japanese invaders with us!" On the evening of 15 August 2012, the Washington China Council for the Promotion of Peaceful National Reunification issued a statement urging the Japanese government to unconditionally release the Hong Kong activists who were defending the Diaoyu Islands.

On 17 July 2012, Tong Zeng, the first person in China to seek compensation from Japan, submitted a written application to the State Oceanic Administration's Island Management Office to lease the Diaoyu Islands and their affiliated islands for tourism development. On 31 August 2012, entrepreneur Chen Guangbiao published a half-page advertisement in Chinese and English in The New York Times, declaring that the Diaoyu Islands belong to China and "calling on the US government and people from all walks of life to condemn Japan's provocative behavior."

On 1 September 2012, Chinese students in Sweden held a demonstration near the Japanese Embassy in Sweden, singing the "March of the Volunteers", the national anthem of China, and displaying a banner that read "We will defend the Diaoyu Islands to the death; the Chinese people will never yield." On 3 September 2012, Chinese people in France and overseas Chinese held a demonstration at the Japanese Embassy in France, displaying banners that read "We will defend the Diaoyu Islands to the death, the Chinese people will never yield," "Celebrating the 67th anniversary of the victory in the Anti-Fascist War," and "The Japanese Emperor kneels down to apologize." They chanted slogans such as "Recover the Diaoyu Islands," "Down with imperialism," and " Long live the unity of Greater China," and played the "March of the Volunteers."

On 16 September 2012, Chinese Americans held demonstrations in Washington, D.C., San Francisco, Chicago, New York City and other U.S. cities to protest Japan's acquisition of the Diaoyu Islands and to call on Chinese Americans not to forget the national humiliation of 18 September. On 27 September 2012, Chinese expatriates in New York City demonstrated in front of the headquarters of the United Nations to protest the Japanese government's purchase of the Diaoyu Islands.

=== Taiwan ===
==== Government ====
On 2 May 2012, when officials from the Ministry of the Interior, the Ministry of Foreign Affairs and the Ministry of National Defense reported to the Legislative Yuan’s Foreign Affairs and National Defense Committee on "the necessary actions to safeguard sovereignty over the Diaoyu Islands and the South China Sea," Chen Ou-po, a Democratic Progressive Party (DPP) legislator from Yilan County, asked: "If Taiwanese people want to buy the Diaoyu Islands, how should they do it?" Chien Ta-lang, the Deputy Minister of the Interior, replied: "Since the Diaoyu Islands are state-owned territory, they cannot be sold according to law; Japan regards the Diaoyu Islands as private property, so ownership of the islands can be acquired through private sales. As for landing on the islands, it is difficult to land on the Diaoyu Islands because they are currently under Japanese control, and the Ministry of the Interior does not encourage people to go to the Diaoyu Islands."

On 5 August 2012, Taiwanese President Ma Ying-jeou put forward the "East China Sea Peace Initiative" on the Diaoyu Islands: "The East China Sea Peace Initiative has five points, namely, all relevant parties should: First, exercise self-control and not escalate confrontational actions. Second, all relevant parties should set aside disputes and not give up dialogue and communication. Third, all relevant parties should abide by international law and handle disputes peacefully. Fourth, all relevant parties should seek consensus and formulate a code of conduct for the East China Sea. Fifth, all relevant parties should establish a mechanism to cooperate in developing East China Sea resources." On 7 August, Japanese Foreign Minister Koichiro Genba responded: "From the perspective of the sovereignty of the Senkaku Islands, we cannot accept Taiwan's independent claim. However, Japan does not want the Senkaku Islands to affect the good Japan–Taiwan relations." On 9 September 2012, Ma Ying-jeou took a helicopter to Pengjia Islet for inspection. From the air defense identification zone (ADIZ) at 123 degrees east longitude, he looked out over the Diaoyu Islands to assert sovereignty. This was the closest the President of the Republic of China had ever come to assert sovereignty over the Diaoyu Islands.

==== Political parties and other political figures ====
On 3 May 2012, Yok Mu-ming, chairman of the New Party, launched a campaign to "purchase the administration rights of the Diaoyu Islands." On 12 July 2012, Lin Chih-chia, Secretary-General of the Taiwan Solidarity Union, told the public media: "The Diaoyu Islands are Japanese territory, and it is the Japanese government’s right to use them as it sees fit. The Diaoyu Islands belonged to the Ryukyu Kingdom in ancient times. Taiwan’s claim that the Diaoyu Islands are inherent territory of the Republic of China is untenable."

Former Taiwanese President Lee Teng-hui once said "The Diaoyu Islands belong to Japan." At the same time, he said in the Japanese magazine Bungei Shunjū that "The mainland's attitude towards the Diaoyu Islands is like seeing a beautiful woman and claiming her as its own wife." On 13 July, Lee Teng-hui said to college students at the "2012 Summer Green Lion Camp" event held by the Taiwan Strategic Planning Association that "The relationship between Taiwan and the Diaoyu Islands began in the Japanese era. It is a fishing ground issue. Taiwan should discuss with Japan whether Taiwanese fishermen can also fish there. But to say that it is our territory is inexplicable. They say that the Diaoyu Islands are part of Toucheng Township, Yilan County. Then go ask the mayor of Toucheng Township, is the Diaoyu Islands ours? Taiwan is very naive and handles things very poorly."

On 15 August 2012, DPP Chairman Su Tseng-chang said after the DPP Central Standing Committee meeting: "The Diaoyu Islands belong to us, and we will never give them up. The Diaoyu Islands issue should be handled with peace as the priority. When Ma Ying-jeou was in opposition, he spoke very hard on the Diaoyu Islands issue, but now his attitude is very soft. He believes that the Diaoyu Islands issue should be handled with avoiding conflict, prioritizing peace, and protecting fishing rights. The reason why Ma Ying-jeou is worrying is that on the one hand he seems to propose peace initiatives, and on the other hand he does things that cause conflict. This is what is worrying."

Yilan County Magistrate Lin Tsung-hsien, along with fishermen from Yilan County aboard the "Protecting Fisheries" rescue vessel, circled the Diaoyu Islands in the direction of the islands, declaring that the Diaoyu Islands belonged to Toucheng Township, Yilan County. At the same time, he proposed to hang a doorplate for Toucheng Township on the Diaoyu Islands and invited Ma Ying-jeou to land on the Diaoyu Islands together. On 30 August 2012, Yilan County Councilors Lin Yueh-hsien, Chen Chin-lin, Tsai Wen-yi, and others communicated with Toucheng Township Mayor Chen Hsiu-nuan and Township Representative Council Chairman Lin Le-tse, planning to nail the doorplate "No. 1, Diaoyu Island Road, Toucheng Township" to the Diaoyu Islands.

==== Society ====
On 18 June 2012, Terry Gou, chairman of Foxconn, said at a shareholders' meeting: "(I) have great respect for the Japanese and like their ‘execution’ and ‘communication’. In particular, the Japanese can reject you to your face, but they will never stab you in the back; but the Koreans are different. ... They are willing to invest in buying the Diaoyu Islands and jointly develop them with Japan. "

=== United States ===
==== Government ====
On 8 July 2012, a senior United States State Department official told Japanese media reporters that "the Senkaku Islands fall under the scope of Article 5 of the U.S.–Japan Security Treaty (which stipulates the U.S. defense obligations to Japan)," and that the U.S. could intervene in the war in the event of a conflict over the Senkaku Islands in accordance with the U.S.–Japan Security Treaty. On 7 August 2012, U.S. Assistant Secretary of State for East Asian and Pacific Affairs Kurt M. Campbell asked the Japanese government to consult with Beijing on the issue of nationalizing the Senkaku Islands and to make a notification. The Japanese side firmly believed that China would eventually understand the necessity of nationalization and accept it. Campbell was uncertain and uneasy about this. On 4 December 2012, the U.S. Senate passed the "Amendment to the National Defense Authorization Act for Fiscal Year 2013 (October 2012 – September 2013)," which explicitly states that "the Senkaku Islands are subject to Article 5 of the U.S.–Japan Security Treaty."

==== Public ====
On 18 May 2012, Rebiya Kadeer, president of the World Uyghur Congress residing in the United States, handed ¥100,000 yen to Takeo Hiranuma, representative of the Sunrise Party and member of parliament, to support Japan's purchase of the Senkaku Islands and to plead with Japan to purchase Xinjiang, "hoping that Japan will buy Xinjiang." On 14 September 2012, John Copper, a professor of international relations at Rhodes College, wrote in The National Interest, "The Island Dispute in the East China Sea": "New findings by scientists may suggest that geography no longer supports Japan’s sovereignty claim. The Diaoyu Islands are not geographically part of the Ryukyu Islands as long as it has been believed, but may instead be an extension of the Chinese continental shelf, although this has not yet been determined under the relevant provisions of international law."

On 3 October 2012, The New York Times published an opinion piece by Nicholas Kristof entitled "The Inconvenient Truth Behind the Diaoyu/Senkaku Islands," which stated "This is a dispute that both sides should refer to the International Court of Justice, rather than allow to boil over in the streets. That said, when I look at the underlying question of who has the best claim, I’m sympathetic to China’s position. I don’t think it is 100 percent clear, partly because China seemed to acquiesce to Japanese sovereignty between 1945 and 1970, but on balance I find the evidence for Chinese sovereignty quite compelling."

=== International reactions ===
- Mongolia: On 2 October 2012, Mongolian Foreign Minister Nyamaagiin Enkhbold met with Japanese Foreign Minister Koichiro Genba, who explained the ownership of the Senkaku Islands to him. Japanese media reported Enkhbold expressed his support for the Senkaku Islands belonging to Japan. The official website of the Mongolian Ministry of Foreign Affairs listed an explanation, pointing out that Mongolian Foreign Minister Enkhbold did not support the view of "Japan's inherent territory" on the Senkaku Islands issue with Japanese Foreign Minister Koichiro Genba. Instead, he said that "it is hoped that China and Japan will exercise restraint on the Senkaku Islands issue and resolve the issue through consultation." Chinese media reported that his pro-Japan remarks were fabricated by the Japanese media Kyodo News.
- Panama: On 22 October 2012, Panamanian President Ricardo Martinelli, whose country maintained diplomatic relations with Taiwan at the time, said at a press conference in Tokyo: "Regarding the Senkaku Islands issue, on the issue of Japan's and China's positions, we support Japan." He also acknowledged the view that "the Senkaku Islands are Japan's inherent territory." This was also the first country to stand up and clearly express its support for the Senkaku Islands belonging to Japan.
- Philippines: On 10 December 2012, Philippine Foreign Minister Albert del Rosario told reporters regarding the governing policies of Japanese Liberal Democratic Party President Shinzo Abe: "Support Japan in revising its pacifist constitution and rearming its military to counter China's escalating military posture"; at the same time, Department of Foreign Affairs spokesman Raul Hernandez said: "We hope that Japan will support a peaceful resolution to the disputes here (in the South China Sea), and that forming stronger allies is in the interest of the Philippines."

== Related events ==
=== Baodiao movement ===
Activists from both sides of the Taiwan Strait and Hong Kong launched numerous landing movements on the islands. Some of them successfully landed on the islands, while others were prevented from going to sea by their respective governments.

On 16 June 2012 the World Chinese Alliance for Defending the Diaoyu Islands organized activists from both sides of the Taiwan Strait and Hong Kong and Macau to travel from mainland China to Diaoyu Islands to assert sovereignty, but they were stopped by the government of China. On 4 July, Huang Xilin, president of the World Chinese Alliance for Defending the Diaoyu Islands, entered the territorial waters of Diaoyu Islands under the protection of the Republic of China Coast Guard and threw down the Chinese flag. On 14 July, 20 activists from mainland China planned to go to sea from Fenghua, but were stopped by the Ningbo Municipal People's Government. Among them, Sheng Xingyuan from Henan was beaten by the head of the local police station after returning to his hometown.

On 15 August 2012, 14 activists arrived in the waters near Diaoyu Island aboard the "Qifeng No. 2" and were intercepted by the Japan Coast Guard. Seven of them jumped into the sea and swam to Diaoyu Island, where they planted the flags of both the PRC and the ROC. They were subsequently arrested by the Japanese government and released on 17 August.

=== Japanese ambassador car incident ===
On 27 August 2012, two men from Hebei and Heilongjiang provinces (Guo from Hebei and Xia from Heilongjiang) intercepted the car of the Japanese ambassador to China and removed the Japanese flag. Beijing police quickly solved the case and arrested the two men. According to the Law on Penalties for Administration of Public Security, one was administratively detained and the other was warned. At the same time, China promised Japan to severely punish similar incidents.

=== Anti-Japanese demonstrations in China ===
Starting in August 2012, large-scale anti-Japanese demonstrations took place in many Chinese cities, demanding the defense of the Diaoyu Islands and launching a large-scale boycott of Japanese goods. Some acts of vandalism and looting also occurred during the demonstrations, with the U-lock incident later becoming a symbol of mindless patriotism.

=== Taiwan essay competition ===
On 14 August 2012, the Ministry of Foreign Affairs of Taiwan held a "Short Essay Competition on the Sovereignty of the Diaoyu Islands," which was divided into three groups: high school group, college group (including graduate students) and social group. Participants chose one of two topics to write an essay on: "My Views on Resolving the Sovereignty Dispute over the Diaoyu Islands" and "My Views on the Sovereignty Dispute over the Diaoyu Islands," to assert sovereignty over the Diaoyu Islands. However, it was criticized by some as meaningless.

== Aftermath ==
=== Chinese countermeasures ===
After the Japanese government nationalized the islands, the Chinese government took a series of countermeasures against Japan. Customs offices across China stepped up their inspections of Japanese imports, and customs clearance became slower.

The Beijing Municipal Bureau of Press and Publication held a meeting with the heads of relevant publishing houses that published Japanese books, demanding that they "unify their thinking and grasp the direction." Works by Japanese authors and works by Chinese authors related to Japan were affected, and the Wangfujing Bookstore in Beijing removed books by Japanese authors.

Some local governments in China have canceled cooperation with Japanese companies or even torn up signed agreements. Some local governments have banned face-to-face meetings with Japanese people and refused to provide necessary materials for visa applications to dispatched employees of Japanese companies.

=== Economic impact ===
From September 2012 to August 2013, the number of Chinese tourists visiting Japan decreased by approximately 25% compared to the same period of the previous year.

Due to the boycott of Japanese goods in China, Japanese automakers such as Toyota, Suzuki, and Mazda faced sales difficulties in China, and their factories were forced to reduce production. Yamamoto Industries, whose Qingdao factory was burned down during the anti-Japanese demonstrations, declared bankruptcy.
