= Netherlands Institute for the Law of the Sea =

Research institute of the University of Utrecht

The Netherlands Institute for the Law of the Sea
- Established: 1984
- Affiliation: Utrecht University
- Location: Utrecht, Netherlands
- Website: NILOS (in Dutch), (in English)

The Netherlands Institute for the Law of the Sea (NILOS) is a research institute established at the University of Utrecht.

In 1984, it was developed jointly by the Utrecht School of Law and the Centre for Environmental Policy and Law (CELP)/NILOS. The university's Department of Public International, Social and Economic Law (ISEP) was also involved from the outset.

The purpose of the institute is:

- to develop and sustain expertise on all issues related to the law of the sea;
- to enhance and broaden awareness and knowledge of the law of the sea;
- to assist states - in particular developing states -, intergovernmental organizations, national and international non-governmental organizations, companies and individuals in dealing with law of the sea issues.

In 2000, NILOS and the Faculty of Law at the University of Sydney in New South Wales, Australia initiated a joint research project studying institutional frameworks developed in the 21st century as the law of the sea evolves.

== Publications ==
The institute publishes annual and biennial reports, books. documentary yearbooks, newsletter, online papers.

== See also ==
- Max Planck Institute for Comparative Public Law and International Law
- Fridtjof Nansen Institute
