= Shaw Han-yi =

Taiwanese academic

Shaw Han-yi (Chinese: 邵漢儀; pinyin: Shào Hànyí) is a Taiwanese academic and research fellow at the National Chengchi University.

== Selected works ==
In a statistical overview derived from writings by and about Han-yi Shaw, OCLC/WorldCat lists only 1 work in 1 language and 52 library holdings.

- The Diaoyutai/Senkaku Islands Dispute: Its History and an Analysis of the Bases of Claims of the P.R.C., R.O.C., and Japan (1997)
- The Diaoyutai/Senkaku Islands Dispute: Its History and an Analysis of the Ownership Claims of the PRC, ROC, and Japan (1999)
