= Pan Zhongqi =

Chinese scholar

Pan Zhongqi (潘忠岐) is a Chinese scholar, with a brief experience in Chinese diplomacy. He is currently a professor at Fudan University in Shanghai.

== Educational background ==
Pan was awarded his Ph.D. in international relations in 1999. Post-doctoral studies provided experience in a variety of academic settings:

- University of Tokyo, visiting scholar, 1999–2000
- Henry L. Stimson Center, visiting scholar, 2001
- Harvard University, Fairbank Center for Chinese Studies, visiting scholar, 2004
- Lund University, visiting scholar, 2006
- Shanghai Institute for International Studies, research fellow, 2000-2005

== Career ==
Pan is a professor at the School of International Relations and Public Affairs, which is located at Fudan University.

In 2008-2009, he was First Secretary at the Mission of the People’s Republic of China to the European Communities.

== Selected works ==
In a statistical overview derived from writings by and about Zhongqi Pan, OCLC/WorldCat encompasses roughly 7 works in 8 publications in 2 languages and 16 library holdings.

- 世界秩序: 结构, 机制与模式 (World Order: Structure, Mechanisms, and Models), 2004
- 多边治理与国际秩序 (Multilateral Governance and International Order), 2006
- 国际责任与大国战略 (China’s International Responsibility and Strategy), 2008

Journals

- "Managing the conceptual gap on sovereignty in China-EU relations," Asia Europe Journal (Germany), Vol. 8, No. 2 (2010): 227-243.
- "US Taiwan Policy of Strategic Ambiguity: a dilemma of deterrence," Journal of Contemporary China (UK), Vol. 12, No. 35 (2003): 387-407.
- "Sino-Japanese Dispute over the Diaoyu/Senkaku Islands: The Pending Controversy from the Chinese Perspective," Journal of Chinese Political Science (US), Vol. 12, No. 1 (2007): 71-92.
