= World Chinese Alliance for Defending the Diaoyu Islands =

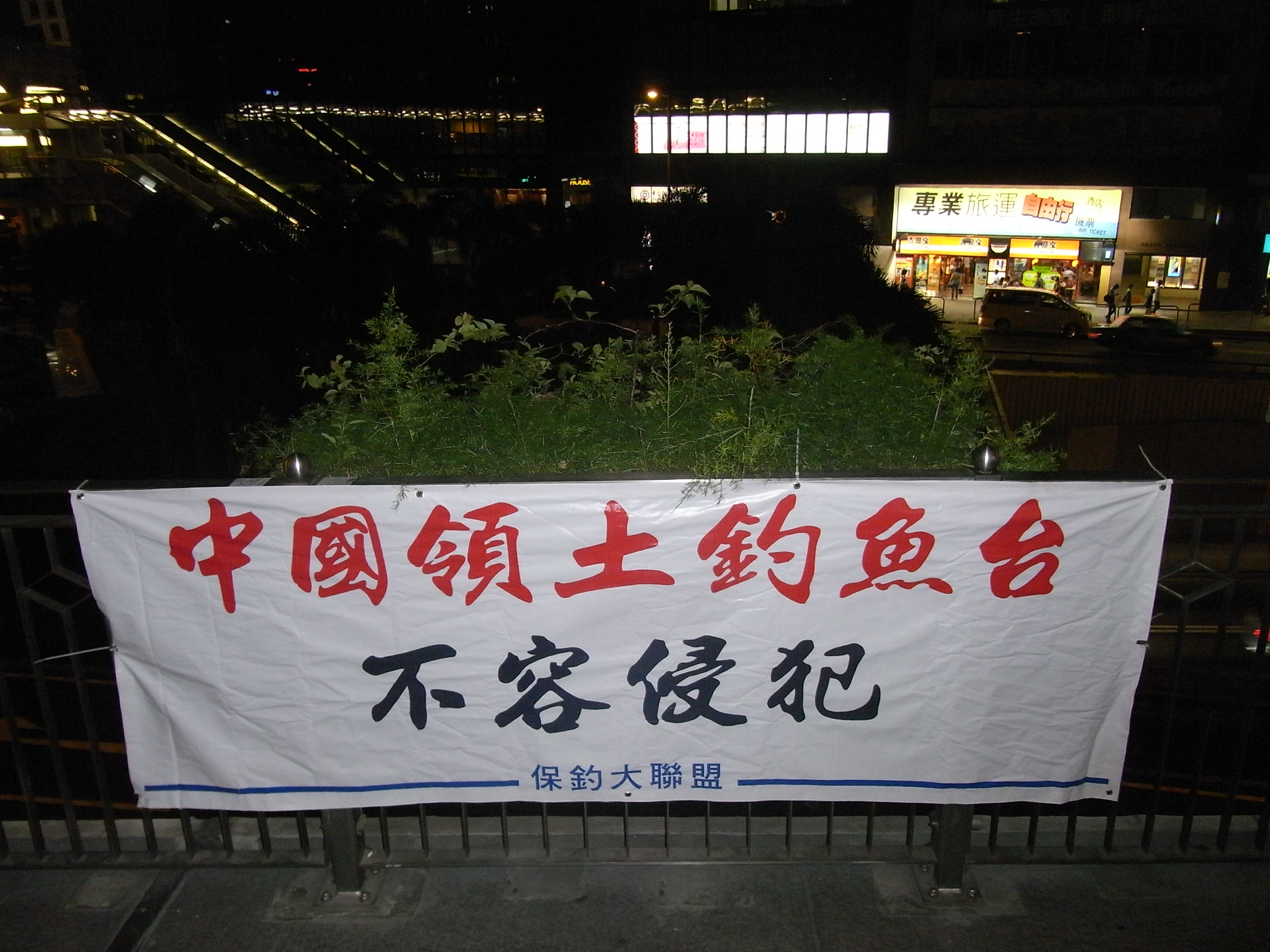
A banner advocating for the defense of the Diaoyu Islands, placed in downtown Hong Kong by the World Chinese Alliance for Defending the Diaoyu Islands; photographed on 18 August 2012.

The World Chinese Alliance for Defending the Diaoyu Islands (Chinese: 世界华人保钓联盟; pinyin: Shìjiè Huárén Bǎodiào Liánméng) is a non-profit Baodiao movement organization composed mainly of Chinese people from six places: Hong Kong, Macau, Taiwan, mainland China, the United States, and Canada. It was established in Hong Kong on 2 January 2011, while the World Chinese Alliance for Defending the Diaoyu Islands Association was officially established on 19 April 2012.

== History ==
On 2 January 2011, the World Chinese Alliance for Defending the Diaoyu Islands was officially established in Hong Kong. On 19 April 2012, the World Chinese Alliance for Defending the Diaoyu Islands was established in Hong Kong. On 21 January 2026, Xie Menglin was elected as the new president of the World Chinese Alliance for Defending the Diaoyu Islands. On 27 January 2026, the World Chinese Alliance for Defending the Diaoyu Islands completed its legal registration with the Licensing Office of the Hong Kong Police Force.

== Baodiao movement ==
On 3 January 2012, eight members of the World Chinese Alliance for Defending the Diaoyu Islands traveled by fishing boat from Hong Kong to the Diaoyu Islands to assert sovereignty, but the action was canceled due to obstruction by the Hong Kong Marine Department. On 16 June 2012, the World Chinese Alliance for Defending the Diaoyu Islands organized national heroes from both sides of the Taiwan Strait and Hong Kong and Macao to travel from the mainland to the Diaoyu Islands to assert sovereignty. However, the participants from the mainland were asked to return by the government of China, which led to the cancellation of the action.

On 12 August 2012, 15 Hong Kong activists, including Yang Kuang, a member of People Power who served as the leader of the delegation, Tsang Kin-shing, a candidate for the Legislative Council election of the League of Social Democrats, Wang Huamin, an executive member of the New West Branch of the Civic Party, and Luo Kanjiu, a member of the Diaoyu Islands Protection Committee, set sail from Tsim Sha Tsui on the "Kai Fung II" to the Taiwan Strait. They were to meet with activists from Pengjia Islet, Macau, Taiwan, and Xiamen to go to Diaoyu Islands together to assert sovereignty. Before departure, Chan Miu-tak, chairman of the Hong Kong Diaoyu Islands Protection Action Committee, told an Agence France-Presse reporter: "If we are intercepted by Japanese ships, we will resist. At the same time, we also hope that the ships of the Chinese People's Liberation Army can escort us." The activists from Taiwan, led by Huang Xilin, planned to depart from Yilan County, Taiwan, the territory to which Diaoyu Islands are claimed to belong.

On 14 August 2012, Taiwan delegation originally planned to go to sea on 14 August, but the ship owner was pressured by the Taiwan authorities and did not agree to go to sea, even to resupply the Hong Kong Diaoyu Islands protection boat. Xiamen Diaoyu Islands protection activists canceled their trip to the Diaoyu Islands to assert sovereignty due to pressure from the mainland authorities and weather reasons. Faced with the lack of support from the government, Li Yiqiang, secretary-general of the World Chinese Alliance for Defending the Diaoyu Islands, said tactfully:

There is still a lot of conservatism on the issue of opening up to the public. The Hong Kong ship has already arrived at the sea area, and a typhoon has formed, so even if it can go now, it is probably too late.... We also hope that the government will give more space to the public Diaoyu Islands protection on this issue.

On 15 August 2012, Hong Kong activists arrived in the waters near Diaoyu Islands aboard the “Kai Fung II”. The Japan Coast Guard dispatched more than 20 ships to intercept them and helicopters to monitor them. They used methods such as ramming and high-pressure water cannons to prevent the activists from landing on the island. Seven of them jumped into the sea and swam to the Diaoyu Islands. They originally planned to plant the flags of the governments of both sides of the Taiwan Strait. However, more than 30 Okinawa police officers who were waiting on the Diaoyu Islands arrested seven people for violating the Japanese Immigration Control and Refugee Recognition Law. The eight activists, four crew members and two Phoenix TV reporters on the “Kai Fung II” which was damaged by the Japan Coast Guard were also taken away by the Okinawa police. Japanese prime minister Yoshihiko Noda said that he would deal with the matter seriously in accordance with Japanese law. On the same day, members of the China Civil Association for the Protection of Diaoyu Islands and the World Chinese Alliance for Defending the Diaoyu Islands held banners and petitions at the Japanese Embassy in Beijing, demanding that "the government of the People's Republic of China recover the lost territory." In Changsha, Hunan, protesters also held banners in front of the Huang Xing statue on the pedestrian street to protest "Japan's occupation of Diaoyu Islands." The protesters claimed that during their detention, they were "not allowed to lie down or lean against anything to rest" and were subjected to "very rough and unfair treatment."

Late on 15 August 2012, Hong Kong chief executive Leung Chun-ying summoned Japanese consul general in Hong Kong Yuji Kumaru, telling him

The Hong Kong government is extremely concerned about the incident and has reiterated to the Japanese government through the Consul General that the Diaoyu Islands and their affiliated islands have been Chinese territory since ancient times. Hong Kong residents have had strong feelings for these islands for many years and do not want to see the Japanese government do anything that is considered provocative by Hong Kong residents. We demand that the Japanese government not endanger the personal and property safety of Hong Kong residents and other Chinese citizens, and urge the Japanese government to release all Hong Kong residents and other Chinese citizens as soon as possible.

On the evening of 15 August, the Washington Council for the Promotion of Peaceful Reunification of China issued a statement urging the Japanese government to release the Hong Kong activists who were defending the Diaoyu Islands unconditionally. Meanwhile, some more radical netizens in Japan expressed their dissatisfaction online. On 16 August 2012, Dong Guoyou, Deputy Minister of Foreign Affairs of Taiwan, met with Tarui Sumio, the Japanese representative to Taiwan, and said:

The Hong Kong activists who took the flag of the Republic of China to the Diaoyu Islands were acting on their own initiative. The Ministry of Foreign Affairs was unaware of this beforehand, and it had nothing to do with the government of the Republic of China.

In March 2013, Huang Xilin, president of the World Chinese Alliance for Defending the Diaoyu Islands, carried the flag of China to carry out activities to protect Diaoyu Islands. On 11 March, Wang Jinwang, director of Taiwan's Coast Guard Administration, said that if similar situations occur in the future, the measures may be revised and no longer escort actions will be taken.
