= Lee Seokwoo =

South Korean academic

Lee Seokwoo (Korean: 이석우) is a South Korean academic, author and member of the law faculty at Inha University at Incheon, Korea.

== Early life ==
Lee earned undergraduate and Master of Laws degrees at Korea University. Further studies led to an LL.M. at the University of Minnesota Law School and an LL.M. in International Legal Studies at New York University School of Law. He was engaged in post-graduate research at George Washington University in 1999 and at the International Boundaries Research Unit (IBRU) at Durham University in 1999-2000. He was also a research scholar at the Asian Studies Centre in St Antony's College at Oxford in 2000.

Lee's doctorate in Public International Law was conferred by Oxford University in 2001. His dissertation was entitled "International Law and the Resolution of Territorial Disputes over Islands in East Asia." In 2001, he was also a visiting scholar in the East Asian Legal Studies Program (EALS) at Harvard Law School in 2001.

== Career ==
Lee is associate professor of law at Inha University at Incheon, Korea.

== Selected works ==
In a statistical overview derived from writings by and about Lee Seokwoo, OCLC/WorldCat lists 2 works in 4 publications in 1 language and 5 library holdings.

- International Law and the Resolution of Territorial Disputes over Islands in East Asia (2001)
- Territorial Disputes Among Japan, China, and Taiwan Concerning the Senkaku Islands (2002)

Journals

- Lee, Seokwoo; Van Dyke, Jon M. (2010-12-01). "The 1951 San Francisco Peace Treaty and Its Relevance to the Sovereignty over Dokdo". Chinese Journal of International Law. 9 (4): 741–762. doi:10.1093/chinesejil/jmq030. ISSN 1540-1650.
- "The 1951 San Francisco Peace Treaty with Japan and the Territorial Disputes in East Asia". Pacific Rim Law & Policy Journal. 11: 63. 2002.
- Chang, Yen-Chiang; Lee, Seokwoo; Sun, Jie (2024-03-01). "Better Ballast Water Discharge Initiative: A Need for Cooperation". Chinese Journal of International Law. 23 (1): 203–206. doi:10.1093/chinesejil/jmae001. ISSN 1540-1650.
- ___________. "Continuing Relevance of Traditional Modes of Territorial Acquisition in International Law and a Modest Proposal," 16 Conn. J. Int'l L. 1, 13 (2000).
