= Unryu Suganuma =

Japanese academic

Unryu Suganuma (菅沼 雲龍, Suganuma Unryu; born 1964) is a Japanese academic interested in international relations, especially China and Japan.

== Early life ==
Suganuma grew up in China and in Japan. He was awarded a master's degree in Chinese Studies at St. John's University in 1992 and he earned a master's degree in International Relations at Syracuse University in 1993. His PhD was conferred by the Maxwell School of Citizenship and Public Affairs in 1996.

== Career ==
Suganuma is associate professor of geography at Oberlin University in Tokyo. His research interests focus on the historical justification of territorial space, investigating the historical argument of territorial disputes or irredentism which is conventionally found in debates claiming "new territory" by many states. His major thesis is that people living in different places during different periods have different concepts of territorial space.

Suganuma is known for arguing "if there is a flash point to ignite a third Sino-Japanese War, it will be the ownership of the Diaoyu Islands in the East China Sea".

== Selected works ==
In a statistical overview derived from writings by and about Unryu Suganuma, OCLC/WorldCat encompasses roughly 7 works in 12 publications in 2 languages and 461 library holdings.

- Historical Justification of Sovereign Right over Territorial Space of the Diaoyu/Senkaku Islands: Irredentism and Sino-Japanese Relations (1996)
- Sino-Japanese Economic Relations 1982-1987: Nakasone Policies toward China (1996)
- Japanese Yen credits to China: Geopolitical, Geoeconomic, and Geo-strategic Considerations of Sino-Japanese Economic Relations, 1979-1994 (1998)
- 中國歷史文化研究 : 《九州》特刊 (2001)
- Sovereign Rights and Territorial Space in Sino-Japanese Relations: Irredentism and the Diaoyu/Senkaku Islands (2000)
- 中日关系与领土主权 (History of Sino-Japanese Relations: Sovereignty and Territory (2007)
- Local Environmental Movements: a Comparative Study of the United States and Japan (2008)
