= Zheng Guanxuan =

Chinese modernist architect

Zheng Guanxuan (Chinese: 鄭觀萱; Wade–Giles: Cheng Kuan-hsuan) was a Chinese architect who was an early practitioner of modernism in China before World War II. He was a member of Five United, a disparate group of Chinese modern architects who had mainly studied in British universities. He also used the name Arthur Koon Hing Cheang.

With other members of the group, he was one of the influential figures in architecture both in mainland China and Taiwan. The other members of Five United were Chen Chan-siang, Huang Zuo-shen, Luke Him Sau and Wang Da-hong.
