= Huang Zuoshen =

China architecture

Huang Zuo-shen
- Born: 1915
- Died: 1975 (aged 59–60)
- Other names: Henry Huang; Henry Wong; Huang Zuoxin
- Occupation: Architect
- Known for: Member of Five United
- Relatives: Huang Zuolin (brother) Huang Shuqin (niece) Chennie Huang 黄承妮 (granddaughter)

Chinese name
- Chinese: 黄作燊
Transcriptions
Standard Mandarin
- Hanyu Pinyin: Huáng Zuòshēn

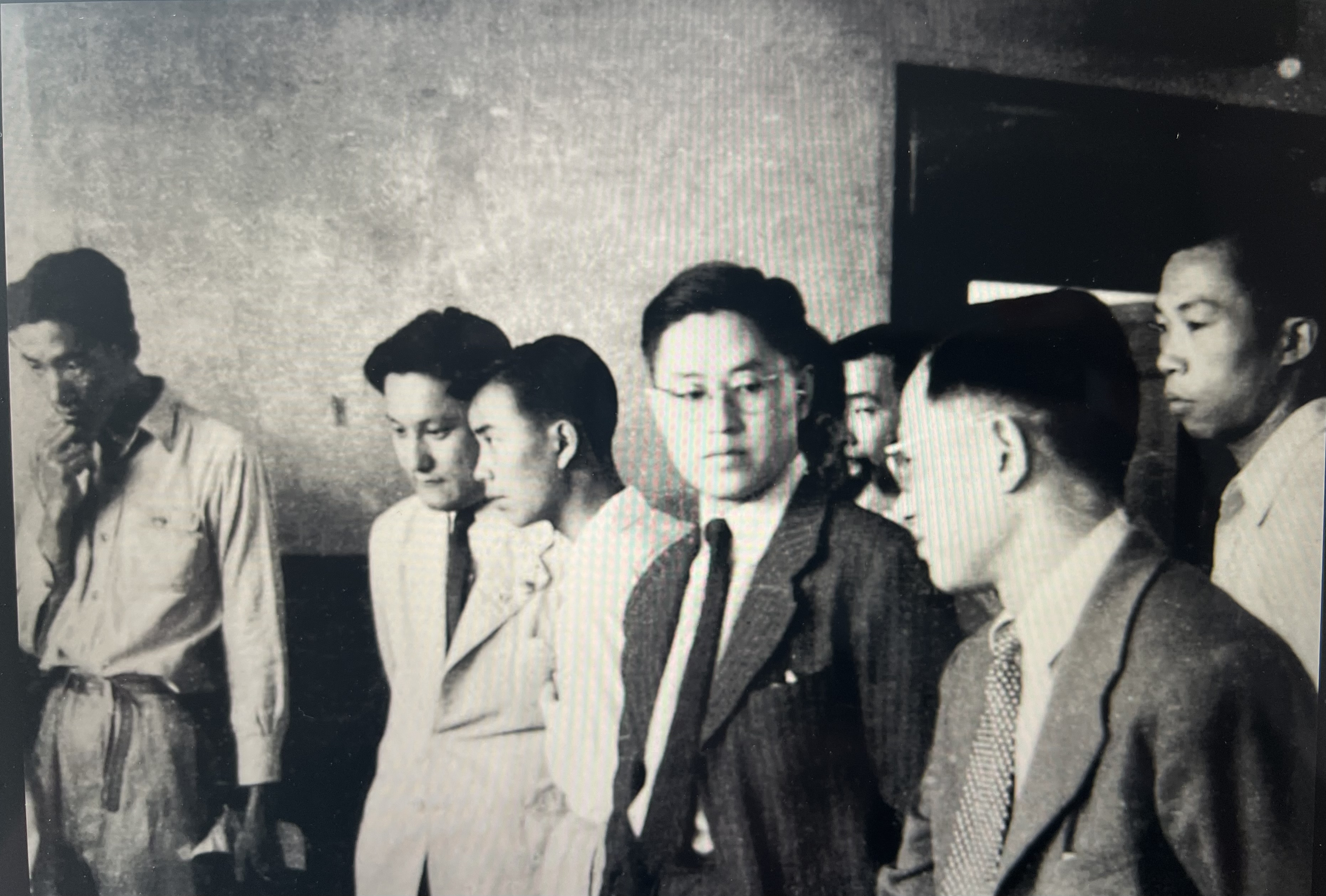
Huang Zuoshen (Henry Huang, centre) with colleagues and students.

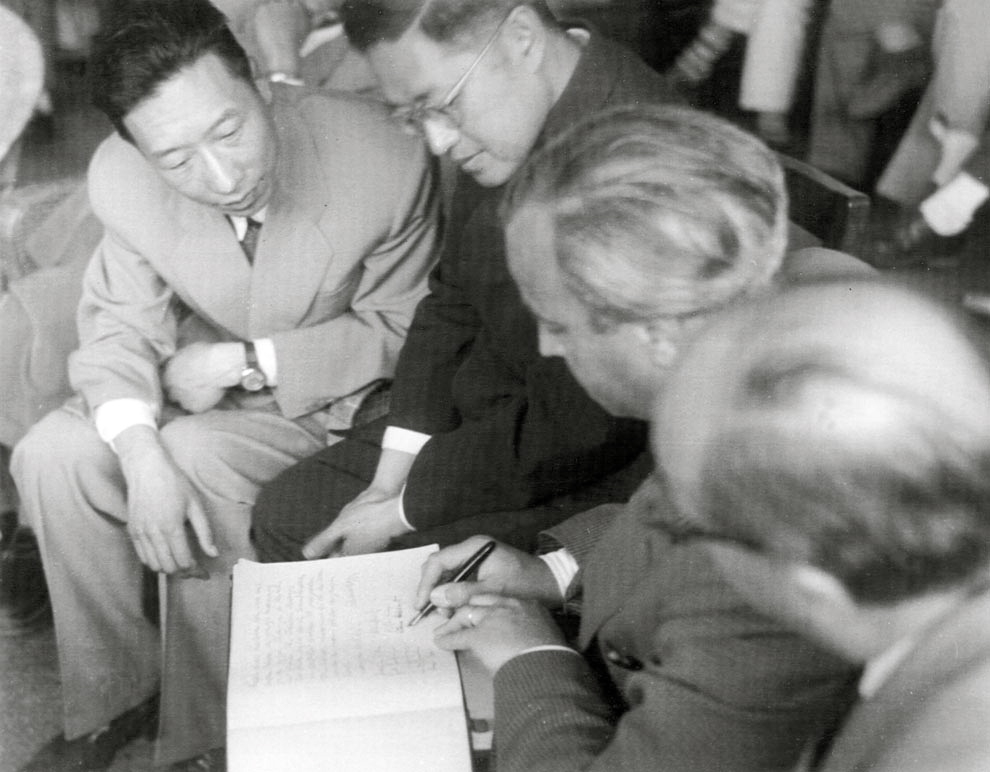
Huang Zuoshen and colleagues

Huang Zuoshen (Chinese: 黄作燊; pinyin: Huáng Zuòshēn; 1915 – 1975; also: Henry Huang; Henry Wong; Huang Zuoxin) was a pioneer of modern architecture in China.

Huang attended the School of the Architectural Association in London from 1933 to 1937, and followed Walter Gropius in 1939 to the United States to study at Harvard University, instead of taking an offer from Le Corbusier for an internship in his studio.

He returned to China in 1942, after being invited to found the Department of Architecture at St. John's University in Shanghai – where his teachings would be first in the country to follow the Bauhaus School. He also helped establish a practice called Five United, which was a disparate group of Chinese architects who had mostly studied at British universities. The others in the group were Wang Da-hong, Chen Chan-siang, Luke Him Sau and Arthur Kun-Shuan Cheang.

Huang emphasised Functionalism and Modernism in his teachings at St. John's University, and was later Founding Director of the Department of Architecture at Tongji University 同济大学 from 1952 to 1954.

In 1948, Huang delivered a lecture titled "Chinese Architecture" that demonstrated his engagement with traditional Chinese architectural theory alongside his modernist practice. In the lecture, Huang addressed the challenges Western audiences face in understanding Chinese architecture, critiquing the comparative approach of historians like Banister Fletcher as inadequate for the subject. He discussed the 1100 AD technical treatise by Li Chieh (李誡), examining why Chinese building traditions historically positioned architects as craftsmen rather than celebrated intellectuals in the Western sense. Using the Forbidden City and Ming tombs as case studies, Huang analyzed how Chinese architecture expressed Confucian social hierarchies and ceremonial functions through spatial arrangement. The lecture concluded with an exploration of the traditional Chinese garden-house ideal, drawing on literary sources including Dream of the Red Chamber to illustrate architecture's integration with nature, poetry, and contemplative experience.

Huang Zuoshen's father once served as Comprador of Shell International Oil Products B.V. for this, during the Cultural Revolution he and his brother Huang Zuolin (an important film director of 20th century China) suffered because of their father's affiliation with a western business entity. Both were subjected to severe interrogation, Huang Zuoshen had been imprisoned under witness by his students at Tonji University 同济大学. (Life and Death in Shanghai Author: Nien Cheng Pg. 23-5, 28; 22-9; Cheng was a close friend of Huang Zuoshen and his wife Winifred Chen. They met in Europe then continued to be friends once upon their return to Shanghai.)

He was survived by his wife Winifred Cheng 程玖 (1924–1977) she was the daughter of 程克 Cheng Ke (1878-1936) an important political figure in the Republic of China, and his three sons.
