= Friends of Nature (China) =

Friends of Nature (FON, Chinese: 自然之友; pinyin: zìrán zhī yǒu) is the People's Republic of China's oldest environmental non-government organization. On March 31, 1994, the organization was officially registered under the name Green Culture Institute of the International Academy of Chinese Culture under the Ministry of Civil Affairs. The focus of the group is to raise awareness about environmental protection ( such as saving endangered species, recycling, energy conservation etc.) through workshops, field trips and the training of teachers. Furthermore, FON has been instrumental in the development of other environmental NGOs and student groups across China because NGOs in China are technically forbidden from establishing branch offices. FON was China's first legal NGO.

== People ==
FON was founded by Liang Congjie, son of Liang Sicheng and Lin Huiyin, two of the leading architectural historians in 20th century China. The activist Hu Jia became interested in environmental issues while participating in the activities of FON.

== Tibetan antelope ==
In 1996, FON members traveled to Kekexili to collect information about the Tibetan antelope population. Two years later, FON held a series of conferences about the protection of the Tibetan antelope in conjunction with several international NGOs including World Wide Fund for Nature and International Fund for Animal Welfare. The conferences raised awareness about the plight of the antelope.

In October 1998, Liang Congjie submitted an open letter to the British Prime Minister Tony Blair asking the United Kingdom to stop illegal trade on Tibetan antelope fur. Mr. Blair responded the next day, showing his concern and support for the Chinese program to protect the antelope. Tony Blair's response prompted global media attention and large numbers of people set to join the program, helping fund and provide assistance to FON's campaign.
