= Yuantong =

Yuantong may refer to:

- Yuantong Temple (圆通), the most famous Buddhist temple in Kunming, Yunnan province, China
- Yuantong Station (元通), a railway station on lines 1 and 2 of the Nanjing Metro, in Jiangsu province, China
