= Qing Structural Regulations =

1934 text

- Author: Liang Sicheng
- Original title: 清式营造则例
- Language: Chinese
- Publication date: 1934
- ISBN: 978-6131471186

Qing Structural Regulations (清式营造则例) is a monograph on Qing dynasty architecture by the Chinese architect Liang Sicheng, first published in 1934.

Liang based his research of Qing dynasty architecture on the 1734 Qing dynasty Architecture Method (Qing Gongcheng Zuofa Zeli 清工程做法则例) of the Qianlong era. He also consulted several craftsmen's manuscripts which had been handed down from generation to generation, and he sought guidance with the palace restoration craftsmen in Beijing. The Forbidden City was the subject of an intense object of study, which he documented with modern drawings and a large number of photographs taken by himself and by his wife. In the end, Liang deciphered a large amount of obscure jargon, making it intelligible to students of architecture, and clarifying the structural characteristics of ancient Chinese architecture.

Since its publication over seven decades ago, it has been the principal textbook on the essence of ancient Chinese architecture. As Liang put it, this book and Yingzao Fashi are the "two grammar books of Chinese architecture".

== Content ==
- Foreword
- Preface
- Chapter I Introduction (written by Liang's wife Lin Huiyin)
- Chapter II Plan: Square, circular, oblong
- Chapter III Major Woodwork
  - Dougong: column top set, corner set, intermediate set, Hua gong, traverse gong, ang, qiao, sheng, dou, lou-dou fulcrum.
  - Timber frame: column, base of column, lintel, sub lintel, rafter, purlin, tie, beam, liang, king post, central column, peripheral column, hypostyle column
- Chapter IV Masonry: stone platform, base, wall; curved roof: overhang gable roof, flush gable roof, gable and hip roof, pyramidal roof, ridge, hip.
- Chapter V Decoration: lattice window, door, ceiling decoration.
- Chapter VI Color paint: classification and order: dragon pattern, flower pattern, Suzhou style landscape pattern, story pattern.
- Appendices
- Glossary
- Measurements
- Drawings
- Yingzao Suanli (Architecture Material Estimate), distilled from craftsmen's handbooks.

Thirteen Chapters.
