= Chen Chan-siang =

- Born: 13 June 1916
- Died: 12 March 2001 (aged 84)
- Other names: Charles Chen, Chi Ziang Chen, Chen Zhanxiang
- Education: University of Liverpool
- Occupation: Architect
- Known for: Liang-Chen Proposal

Chinese name
- Chinese: 陳占祥
Transcriptions
Standard Mandarin
- Hanyu Pinyin: Chén Zhānxiáng

Chen Chan-siang (Chinese: 陳占祥; pinyin: Chén Zhānxiáng; 13 June 1916 – 12 March 2001) was an urban planner and architect. Chen was a member of Five United, a firm which pioneered modernist architecture in China in the 1940s. Other members of Five United included Huang Zuo-shen, Wang Da-hong and Luke Him Sau. He is also known as Charles Chen, Chi Ziang Chen, Chen Zhangxiang.

== Biography ==
Chen studied in England in the early 1940s, where he was the first foreign student to chair the Students' Union at the Architecture School of University of Liverpool. As a student, he also published several papers on Chinese architectural traditions and practices, under the guidance of Sir Nicholas Pevsner.

In October 1949, he went to Beijing to work. There, he was co-publisher, with Liang Sicheng, of the Liang-Chen Proposal, which applied Western concepts and techniques to the planning and modernisation of Beijing. The proposal included suggestions for protecting some of the ancient parts of the city. Chen was one of several architects persecuted by the government in the early days of Communist China.

In January 1988, he was invited to give lectures in the United States. He taught at the University of California at Berkeley, Cornell University and others. Chen returned to China in 1989, and died in Beijing on 12 March 2001.

Chen has been described as 'one of the foremost architects and city planners in modern Chinese history' by Professor Marwyn Samuels of Syracuse University.
