= Liang Congjie =

Chinese historian and activist

- Born: 4 August 1932; Beijing, Republic of China
- Died: 28 October 2010 (aged 78); Beijing, People's Republic of China
- Title: President of the Friends of Nature
- Spouse: Fang Jing
- Children: Liang Jiang; Liang Fan
- Parent(s): Liang Sicheng; Lin Huiyin
- Relatives: Liang Qichao (grandfather); Tan Lin (half-cousin); Maya Lin (half-cousin)
- Awards: 2000 Ramon Magsaysay Award for Public Services

Liang Congjie (Chinese: 梁从诫; pinyin: Liáng Cóngjiè; 4 August 1932 – 28 October 2010) was a Chinese historian best known for his work as an environmental activist who established the Friends of Nature in 1994 as the first environmental non-governmental organization to be officially recognized by the government of the People's Republic of China.

Liang's father, architect Liang Sicheng, had led attempts to prevent the destruction of the walls surrounding Beijing with the land to be used for the construction of highways. His grandfather Liang Qichao spent 14 years in exile in Japan after he advocated on behalf of turning the Qing Dynasty into a constitutional monarchy. His ancestry came to haunt him during the Maoist Cultural Revolution when he was purged for his being the "grandson of China's biggest royalist". Liang was ultimately able to attend Peking University.

Having learned about the activities of Greenpeace, Liang and three of his colleagues at the Academy for Chinese Culture came to agreement that a corresponding organization was required in China to address growing environmental concerns in that country. The group that they formed, Friends of Nature, eschewed Greenpeace's more confrontational techniques, choosing to develop grassroots concern about nature through fostering environmental awareness in schools and establishing the nation's first birdwatching group. The organization worked with the Chinese government to ensure enforcement of existing environmental law, including efforts to protect a Tibetan antelope which were on the path to extinction and videotaping the cutting stands of old-growth forest in Western China that led to a 1999 order by Zhu Rongji prohibiting cutting down such trees.

Environmentalist Ma Jun described Liang as having "incubated the first generation of environmentalists in China" and described how he worked in conjunction with the government on a "constructively critical" basis to build support for protecting the environment. Friends of Nature's Li Bo credited him with "promoting ordinary Chinese's participation in supervising pollution problems and protecting the environment". Liang was recognized in 2000 with the Ramon Magsaysay Award, which recognizes Asian contributions to public service, noting that he was able to push environmental issues while having "avoided the pitfall of alienating government".

Liang died at the age of 78 on October 28, 2010, due to a lung infection while at a hospital in Beijing.
