= Liang-Chen Proposal =

Liang-Chen Proposal, or The Proposal on the Location of the Administrative Central District of the Central People's Government (Chinese: 关于中央人民政府行政中心区位置的建议) is a proposal Chinese architect Liang Sicheng and Chen Zhanxiang handed in to the Chinese Communist Party government in 1950, the full name of the document is "Suggestions on the location of central government district".
