= Lin Huiyin =

Chinese architect and writer (1904–1955)

Lin Huiyin Phyllis Whei Yin Lin
- 林徽因
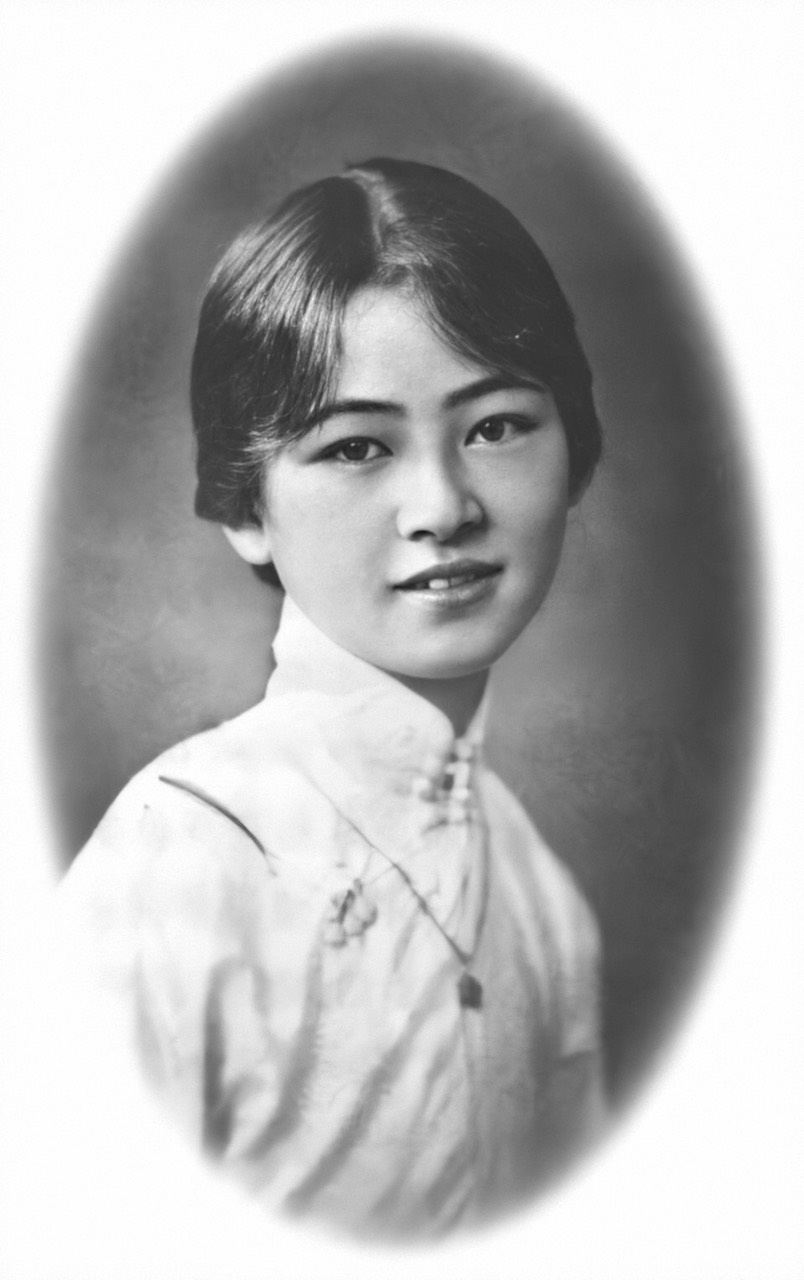
- Born: 10 June 1904; Hangzhou, Zhejiang, Qing dynasty, China
- Died: 1 April 1955 (aged 50); Beijing Tongren Hospital, Beijing, People's Republic of China
- Resting place: Babaoshan Revolutionary Cemetery
- Education: University of Pennsylvania (BFA, BArch); Yale University
- Occupations: architect, poet
- Spouse(s): Liang Sicheng, m. 21 March 1928, wid. 1 April 1955
- Children: Liang Congjie; Liang Zaibing
- Relatives: Liang Qichao (father-in-law)

Lin Huiyin (Chinese: 林徽因, born 林徽音; pinyin: Lín Huīyīn; 10 June 1904 – 1 April 1955; known as Phyllis Whei Yin Lin when studying in the United States) was a Chinese architect, writer, and poet. She is known to be the first female architect in modern China. Her husband was Liang Sicheng, named as the "father of modern Chinese architecture".

In the ninth year of the Republic of China (1920), Lin Huiyin traveled to Europe with her father Lin Changmin. In the twelfth year of the Republic of China (1923), she participated in the activities of the Crescent Moon Society. In the thirteenth year of the Republic of China (1924), she studied in the United States at the University of Pennsylvania School of Fine Arts, taking courses in the Department of Architecture and earning a Bachelor of Arts degree (to be posthumously awarded a Bachelor of Architecture degree in 2024). Later, she studied at the Yale University School of Drama in the Department of Stage Art. Department of Northeastern University in 1928, together with Liang Sicheng, she annotated and reviewed the "Great Tang Records on the Western Regions" from the collection of the Chinese Architecture Society (hundreds of Tang Dynasty buildings and place names), discovering the Tang Dynasty architecture – the Foguang Temple on Mount Wutai. After the liberation, Lin Huiyin made contributions to the design of the emblem of the People's Republic of China, the design of the Monument to the People's Heroes, and the innovation of cloisonné craftsmanship, and authored "Poetry Collection of Lin Huiyin" and "Essays of Lin Huiyin".

After 1949, as professors in Tsinghua University in Beijing, Liang and Lin began restoration work on cultural heritage sites of China in the post-imperial Republican Era of China, a passion which she would pursue to the end of her life. The American artist Maya Lin is her niece and the American poet Tan Lin is her nephew.

== Early life and education ==
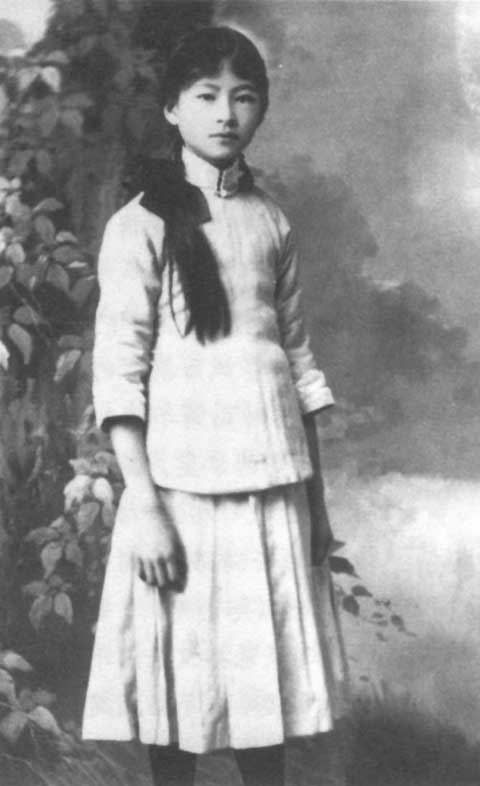
Lin Huiyin as a young girl

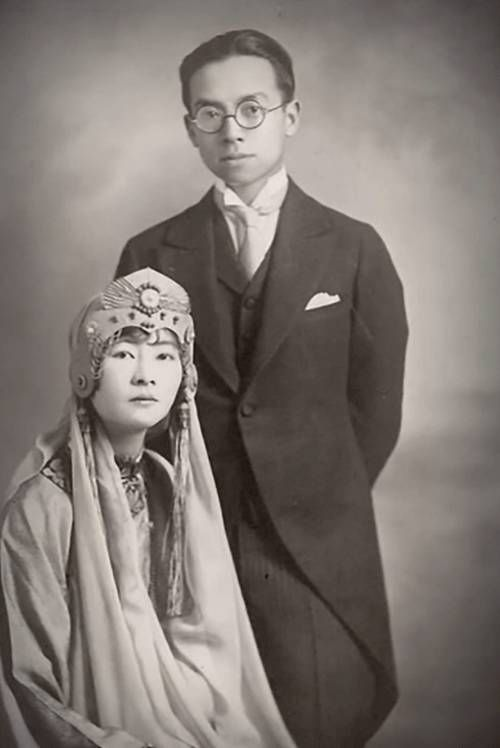
Liang Sicheng and Lin Huiyin's wedding photo

=== Early life ===
Lin was born in Hangzhou though her family was from Minhou. She was the daughter of Lin Changmin (林長民) (16 September 1876 - Minhou, 24 December 1925) and He Xueyuan (何雪媛) (1882–1972).

At the age of 5, she was tutored by her great-aunt Lin Zemin; at 8, she moved to Shanghai and attended the Hongkou Patriotic Primary School.

In the third year of the Republic of China (1914), Lin Huiyin came to Beijing with her grandfather and lived with her father in Qianwanggongchang.

=== Secondary education ===
In 1916, she attended the Peking Pei Hua Girls' School, which was run by the British Church.

In April 1920, she traveled to Europe with her father, and was influenced by a female architect, who was her landlady in London, to pursue the study of architecture. During this time, she also met her father's disciple Xu Zhimo and developed a strong interest in modern poetry.

After more than a month of traveling in Europe, Lin Huiyin and his father came to London, England. In order not to delay his daughter's studies, Lin Changmin sent Lin Huiyin to St Mary's Girls School in London and hired an English tutor for her. During her more than one year in England, Lin Huiyin read a large amount of Western literature and got used to Western lifestyles such as afternoon tea.

In 1921, she returned to Beijing, China, with her father and continued her studies at Pei Hua Girls' School.

In 1923, Xu Zhimo, Hu Shi, and others established the Crescent Moon Society in Beijing, where Lin Huiyin often participated in the literary and artistic activities.

In April 1924, the sixty-four-year old Indian poet Rabindranath Tagore visited China. Lin Huiyin, along with Xu Zhimo, Liang Sicheng, and others, accompanied Tagore on a tour of Beijing. Lin Huiyin and Xu Zhimo worked together to do the interpretation work for Tagore, during which Lin Huiyin distinguished herself with her fluent English and also won the admiration of the poet. Tagore wrote a poem for Lin Huiyin: The azure of the sky fell in love with the verdant green of the earth, and the breeze between them sighed "Alas!"

In a time when women had limited access to formal education, Lin was able to receive a formal education due to being part of a wealthy family. Because of her family's affluence she was able to travel extensively with her father. She obtained her degrees both in England and the United States. However, Lin's works are highly regarded. Lin wrote free verse, novels and prose. Lin's poems appeared in publications such as the Beijing Morning Post, Crescent Monthly, Poetry and the Dipper and the newspaper L'impartiale in Tianjin.

=== Higher education ===
In 1924, Lin Huiyin and Liang Sicheng both enrolled at the University of Pennsylvania, where she also worked as a part-time assistant at the architectural department. Although they both wanted to pursue architecture studies at the School of Architecture, Lin was not admitted simply because she was a woman. She therefore enrolled at the School of Fine Arts. Despite the university's gender-discriminatory policies, Lin still pursued her passion for architecture and took rigorous architecture courses. Both being born in Dragon year, Lin Huiyin and Liang Sicheng attended school and foster the birth of Chinese architecture. It was here that Lin along with Liang, her future husband and whom she had known since childhood, pursued their love of architecture. She served as a part-time teaching assistant in architectural design at the university from 1926 to 1927.

In 1927, Lin completed the requirements for a Bachelor of Architecture degree. However, because she was a woman, she was not allowed to receive a Bachelor of Architecture degree. On February 24, 1927, Lin was conferred a Bachelor of Fine Arts degree. After her graduation from the University of Pennsylvania in 1927, Lin enrolled in stage design programs in Yale University as a graduate student, pursuing her longtime interest in drama.

=== Posthumously-conferred degree ===
In 1927, although Lin completed the requirements for a Bachelor of Architecture degree under the university's gender-discriminatory policies, she was denied the degree due to her gender and was instead awarded a Bachelor of Fine Arts degree. On October 15, 2023, the University of Pennsylvania decided to correct this century-old gender-discriminatory practice against her. In 2024, the university officially decided to posthumously confer Lin the degree of Bachelor of Architecture. On May 18, 2024, Lin's granddaughter Yu Kui (于葵) attended the School of Design commencement on behalf of Lin and collected Lin's degree diploma from the school's dean Frederick Steiner. The diploma of the Bachelor of Architecture degree was dated February 1927, the month Lin originally graduated from the university. The diploma also noted "This degree is awarded in faculty in order to restore Lin Huiyin to the Class of 1927" (all capitalized) at the bottom of the paper. Lin's name (as well as her alternate name used while in the United States) did not appear in the official 2024 commencement program published by the University of Pennsylvania.

== Career ==
=== Early career ===
On September 20, 1925, Lin Huiyin's photograph was featured on the front page of the 268th issue of The Eastern Times Photo Supplement (《图画时报》), a Shanghai-based newspaper photography supplement.

In 1928, Lin Huiyin accepted the marriage proposal from Liang Sicheng. After their wedding, they traveled to Europe to study European architecture.

In August 1928, the couple returned to China together and were both employed by the Department of Architecture at Northeastern University in Shenyang. Before taking up her post, Lin Huiyin went back to Fuzhou to visit her relatives and was invited by Fuzhou Normal School and Yinghua Middle School to give lectures on "Architecture and Literature" and "Garden Architecture Art". She also designed the Fuzhou East Street Art Theater (东街文艺剧场; nowadays known as Fuzhou All-Spring Garden, 福州聚春园) for her uncle Lin Tianmin (林天民). The following year, she taught the courses of "History of Decorative Art" (美术装饰史) and "Professional English" (专业英语) at Northeastern University; her husband Liang Sicheng taught the course of "Introduction to Architecture Studies" (建筑学概论).

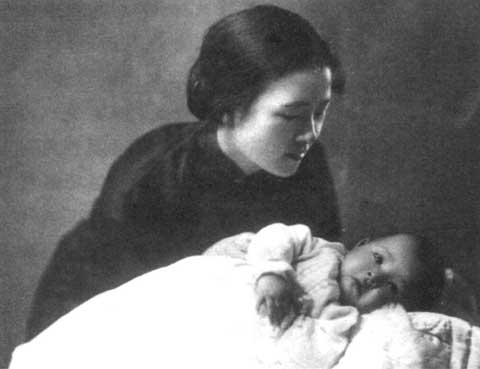
Lin Huiyin and her son, Liang Congjie, ca. 1932

In the early 1930s, she and her husband met and became deep friends with the American scholars, John King Fairbank and Wilma Fairbank.

=== Japanese invasion of China ===
In the wake of the September 18th Incident in 1931, Lin left for Beijing, where she studied ancient Chinese architecture. Upon her return, she helped establish the Architectural Department at Northeastern University in Shenyang, where she then taught architecture briefly. Meanwhile, in 1928, she designed a railway station in Jilin. This was one of the few buildings Lin designed. Throughout the 1930s, Lin and her husband lived in Beiping (nowadays Beijing) near both of their families. Close friends at the time were the Americans Wilma and John K. Fairbank, who admired her sense of living on a "kind of double cultural frontier," and facing the problem of "the necessity to winnow the past and discriminate among things foreign, what to preserve and what to borrow." He recalled the joy she took when she and her husband climbed the roof of the Temple of Heaven, which made her the first woman to attempt the walk on the emperor's palace roof and when in 1937, she discovered the main hall of Foguang Temple near Doucun, Shanxi.

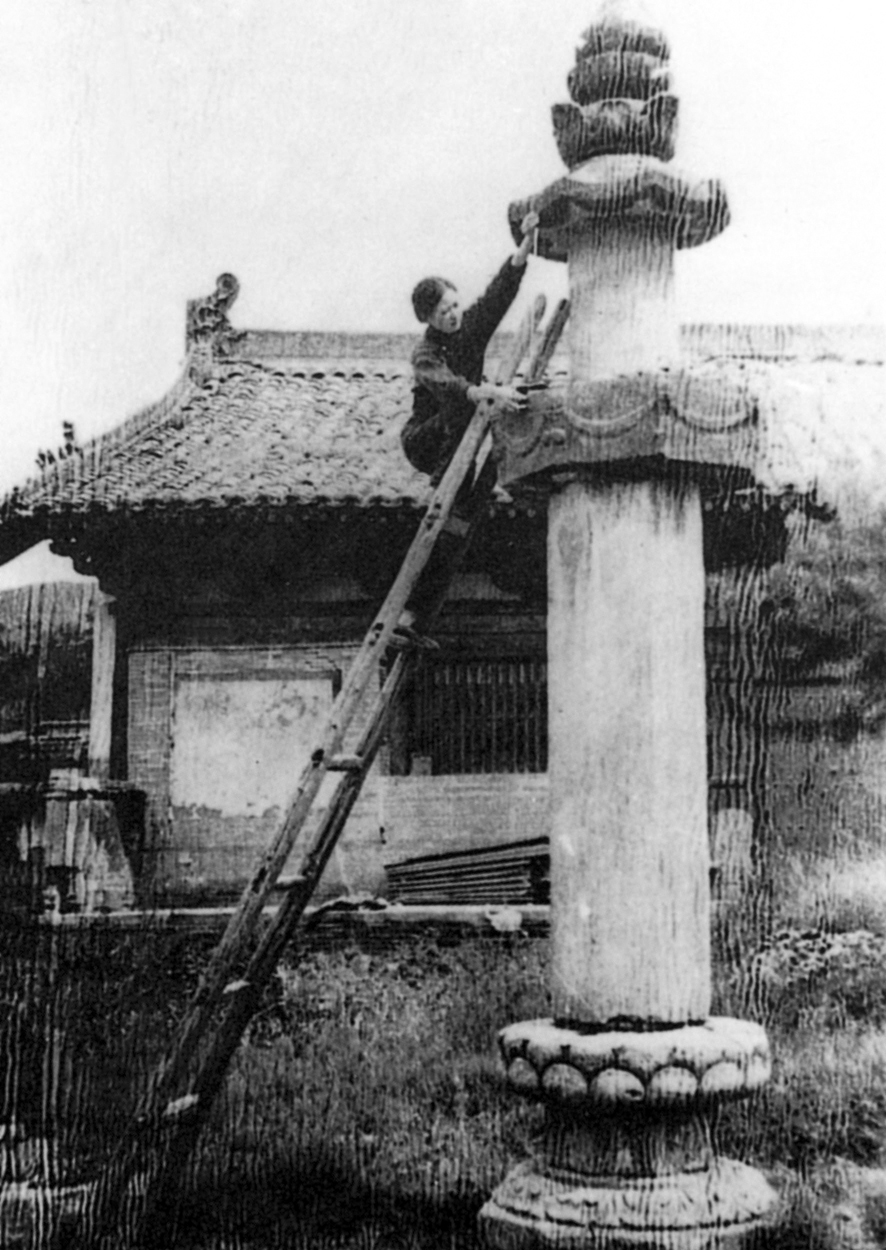
Lin Huiyin conducting an architectural survey of a stone pillar (jingchuang) at Foguang Temple, Mount Wutai, Shanxi, 1937.

Li Huiyin and Liang Sicheng, during the 15 years from 1930 to 1945, conducted surveys on 2738 ancient buildings in 190 counties. Many of these ancient structures gained national and international recognition through their research, leading to their protection. Notable examples include the Zhaozhou Bridge in Hebei, the Yingxian Wooden Pagoda in Shanxi, and the Foguang Temple on Mount Wutai.

In 1931, Lin Huiyin was employed by the Peking Society for the Study of Chinese Architecture (Zhongguo Yingzao Xuehui). The following year, she designed the Geological Hall and the Grey Building student dormitory for Peking University.Over the next several years, she frequently traveled to various provinces such as Shanxi, Hebei, Shandong, Henan, and Zhejiang to conduct field surveys and measurements of dozens of ancient buildings. She published papers and reports on architecture, either independently or in collaboration with Liang Sicheng, including "On Several Characteristics of Chinese Architecture," "Miscellaneous Records of Architecture in the Suburbs of Peking," and "A Brief Survey of Ancient Architecture in Jin and Fen." She also wrote the introduction for Liang Sicheng's book "Qing Style Construction Rules".

Li Huiyin and Liang Sicheng went to Henan for an inspection. They arrived in Jinan in the latter half of June.

In the summer of 1937, she discovered the oldest wooden structure in China in the Wutai Mountain area of Shanxi—the Foguang Temple Main Hall, which was built during the Tang Dynasty.

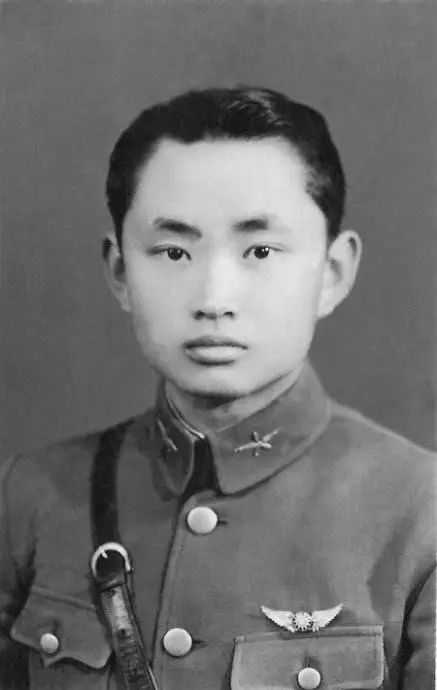
Lin Huiyin's younger brother Lin Heng, who was killed in action in 1941 in an air battle over Chengdu

As Japan's invasion loomed, Lin Huiyin and her husband had to cut-short their promising restoration work of Beijing's cultural heritage sites in 1937 and abandoned their now famous courtyard residence in Beijing to flee southward along with personnel and materials of the Architectural Department of Northeastern University; their exodus led them and their children to temporary sojourns in the cities of Tianjin, Kunming, and finally Lizhuang in 1940. It was in Lizhuang where the bedridden Lin, still suffering from tuberculosis, was told of her younger brother's death while serving as a combat aviator in the air force in the defense of Sichuan. Lin wrote a poetic memorial:

Brother, I do not have words appropriate for this era to mourn over your death. This era made a simple request of you and you responded. Your absolute and simple heroism is a poem of this era. I want to add more sorrow to the unavoidable reality by screaming - you understand why - that you have gone too soon. Brother, your bravery is great. Your death is too cruel.

— Lin Huiyin, Mourning My Third Brother Lin Heng

In the wake of the Lugouqiao Incident, Lin Huiyin and Liang Sicheng moved with the Architecture Society first to Changsha, and then in January 1938 to Kunming, where they lived in a residence called "Zhiyuan" on Xunjin Street. The first research project they undertook was a survey of ancient buildings in Kunming. Liang Sicheng was often away for field investigations, while Lin Huiyin stayed at Xingguo An, managing daily affairs, taking care of and educating their children, and organizing a large amount of drawings and textual materials.

From October to November 1938, more than 50 main ancient buildings in Kunming, including Yuantong Temple, Tuzu Temple, Jianshu Guild Hall, Eastern and Western Pagodas, Zhenqing Temple Hall, and the Golden Pavilion, were surveyed by Lin Huiyin and Liang Sicheng.

In 1940, she followed Liang Sicheng's work unit, the Academia Sinica, to Lizhuang near Yibin, Sichuan, and lived in a low, dilapidated farmhouse.

The life of displacement and the harsh material conditions led to a recurrence of her lung disease. On her sickbed, she read the parts of the Twenty-Four Histories related to architecture, collecting materials for writing "A History of Chinese Architecture," often working late into the night. During this period, her literary works were not many, and in her poetry drafts, confusion, melancholy, desolation, and depression had replaced the tranquility, elegance, clarity, and gentleness of the style before the war. The poems often revealed her concern for the future and fate of the motherland.

=== After the war ===
After the victory of the Anti-Japanese War, Lin Huiyin's family returned to Beiping in August 1946. Soon after, she designed faculty housing for Tsinghua University and accepted design tasks outside the school.

In May 1948, she published nine poems titled "Miscellaneous Poems Written While Ill" (《病中杂诗》) in the "Literary Magazine" (《文学杂志》). At the end of that year, the outskirts of Beiping, where Tsinghua University was located, were liberated by the People's Liberation Army, which encircled the ancient capital. Lin Huiyin and her husband were deeply worried about the destruction of the majestic and magnificent ancient buildings with carved beams and painted rafters within the city, which might be destroyed by the war.

In early 1949, the sudden visit of two representatives of the People's Liberation Army, who showed a protective attitude towards important cultural relics and ancient sites, dispelled their doubts about the Communist Party. They compiled the "National List of Cultural Relics and Ancient Buildings" at the request of the People's Liberation Army. This book later evolved into the "National Cultural Relics Protection Catalogue".

=== People's Republic of China ===
After 1949, Lin Huiyin became a professor of architecture at Tsinghua University. As a literary writer and architectural historian, Lin Huiyin rebuilt the capital from the aspects of cultural tradition, architectural beauty, historical significance, and living conditions of the people. Meanwhile, Lin Huiyin participated in the design of the National emblem and the Monument to the People's Heroes. Lin designed the floral wreath patterns at the base of the Monument to the People's Heroes. Lin also took part in the standardization of Beijing city planning.

In 1950, Lin Huiyin was specially invited to attend the second session of the first National Political Consultative Conference and was appointed as a member of the Beijing City Planning Committee and an engineer. She proposed the idea of building a "City Wall Park".

In 1951, at the age of 47, in order to save the traditional craft of cloisonné, which was on the verge of bankruptcy, Lin Huiyin, despite being ill, worked with Gao Zhuang, Mo Zongjiang, Chang Shana, Qian Meihua, and Sun Junlian to conduct research in factories and designed a series of novel patterns with national characteristics for the "Asia and Pacific Rim Peace Conference" and the "Soviet Cultural Delegation".

In May 1953, Beijing began to consider the demolition of the city's traditional "pai lou" (archway structures), marking the start of a large-scale removal of ancient architecture in the city. To save the only remaining complete archway street from being destroyed due to political reasons, Liang Sicheng, the husband of Lin Huiyin, had a fierce argument with Wu Han, who was then the Deputy Mayor of Beijing. Soon after, at a dinner party hosted by Zheng Zhenduo, the director of the Bureau of Cultural Affairs of the Ministry of Culture, which was attended by well-known figures in the field of cultural relics, Lin Huiyin and Wu Han had a face-to-face confrontation. Subsequently, Lin Huiyin's health deteriorated sharply, and she eventually refused medical treatment.

In October 1953, Lin Huiyin was elected as a member of the first council of the Architectural Society of China (中国建筑学会), a member of the China Architecture Research Committee (中国建筑研究委员会), and an editorial board member of the Architectural Journal (《建筑学报》). In June 1954, she was elected as a congresswoman at the Beijing Municipal People's Congress.

On April 1, 1955, Lin Huiyin died of illness (tuberculosis) in Beijing Tongren Hospital in Dongcheng, Beijing. On April 2, The Beijing Daily published Lin Huiyin's obituary. On April 3, a memorial service for Lin Huiyin was held at Xianliang Temple in Jinyu Hutong (金鱼胡同贤良寺), and her body was buried in Babaoshan Revolutionary Cemetery. The funeral committee for Lin Huiyin consisted of 13 people, including Zhang Xiruo, Zhou Peiyuan, Qian Duan Sheng, Qian Weichang, and Jin Yuelin.

== Publications ==
Lin Huiyin wrote poems, essays, short stories and plays. Many of her works were praised for their subtlety, beauty, and creativity. Some of her more well known works are: Smile, Ninety-nine Degrees, Don't Let Our Land be Lost Again! and Meizhen and Them. Lin along with her husband wrote a book titled A Pictorial History of Chinese Architecture. During this pursuit, Lin along with her husband went to thousands of ancient Chinese architectural sites. She conducted research and preserve China's architectural history. They lobbied hard to protect many of the old buildings in Beijing at a time when many parts of the city were being leveled by the municipal government. She also translated English works into Chinese.

== Literature ==
The poet is only one of her identities. Her talent for poetry and song made her incredibly different. With an interest in writing poems, she met and made friends with lots of famous Chinese poets at that time. Her poem are warm and soft. Most of the poems are related to her personal emotions, such as insight from everyday life and love between friends, family, and romantic relationships. Unfortunately, most of her work destroyed in wars. Few of her poems are recorded and preserved nowadays. It is no doubt that this is the regret of modern Chinese poetry. Some readers suggest that her poem is free-flowing, which is the same as her personality.

Lin Huiyin is well known for her many poems and essays, she was also one of the outstanding female representatives of the May Fourth Movement. Her essays are full of delicate feelings and are combined with the musical sense in the Chinese poetic tradition. Her novels are full of modern content, such as the most famous "You Are the April of This World". Similarly, Lin Huiyin and other writers also participated in the May Fourth Movement. Lin Huiyin skillfully integrated the aesthetics of Tang poetry into the language and syntax of modernism and used the traditional literary practice of episodic narration to combat the gender determinants of these idioms. Lin Huiyin was fond of free love and ideal, but the free love under May Fourth turned into the tragic idealism in the social background, which exacerbated the pain of gender oppression.

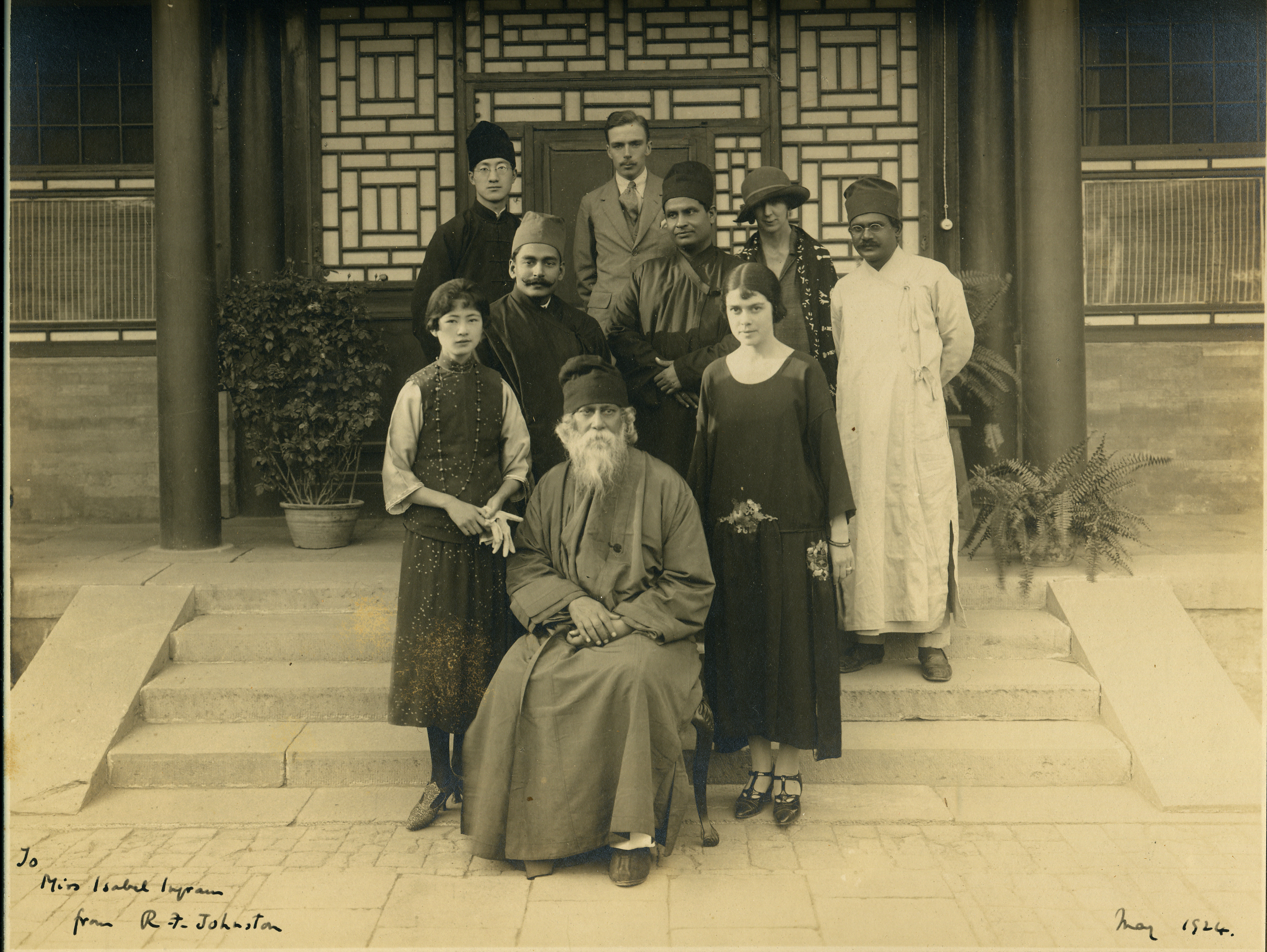
Tagore with Lin Huiyin, tutor Isabel Ingram and others in Beijing in May 1924

In addition to architectural research, Lin Huiyin also engaged in literary creation. As a young girl, Lin Huiyin went abroad with her father to study in Europe. In England, Lin met Xu Zhimo in England, who guided her to the road of literature. Therefore, Lin Huiyin set her foot on the road of literature. Xu Zhimo encouraged Lin Huiyin to write literature, especially poetry. Later, they organized activities, performed dramas, and experimented with more literary forms together. When Rabindranath Tagore came to China, Lin and Xu worked together as translators, contacting the great poets of the world and learning poems from Tagore. She was more famous because she became the leading lady in Tagore's drama Chitra.

Because Lin Huiyin had a strong understanding of literature, her poems are rich in themes. During the transient years, in the quiet contemplation at night, Lin Huiyin has been used to expressing her feelings in poetry. Her poems often reveal the subtlety of human love, the silent beauty of nature, and the fortitude of life.

== People Contributions ==
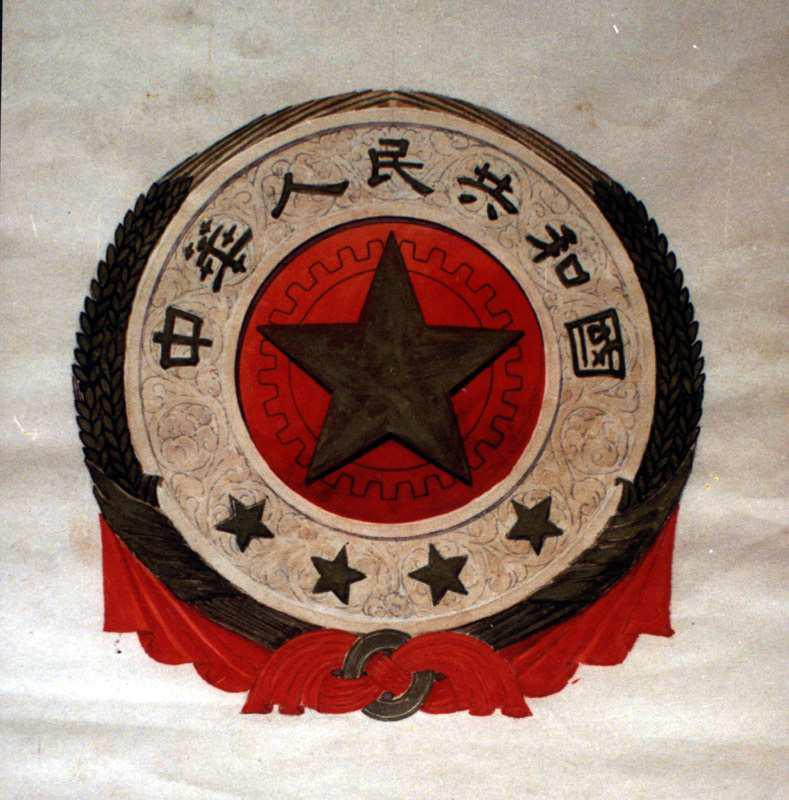

The Design of the Emblem of the New China

In late September 1949, Lin Huiyin, along with ten teachers from the architecture department, participated in the design of the emblem pattern. She devoted all her efforts and knowledge to this design. Their design proposal was selected as the emblem by the second session of the first National Committee of the Chinese People's Political Consultative Conference in June 1950. In 1950, Lin Huiyin was appointed as a member of the Beijing Urban Planning Committee and engineer. In 1951, she was appointed as a member of the People's Heroes Monument Construction Committee, undertaking the task of designing the decorative patterns and wreath reliefs of the monument's base. Later, people placed a small piece of tombstone with her designed wreath pattern draft in front of her own tomb at Babaoshan to commemorate her.

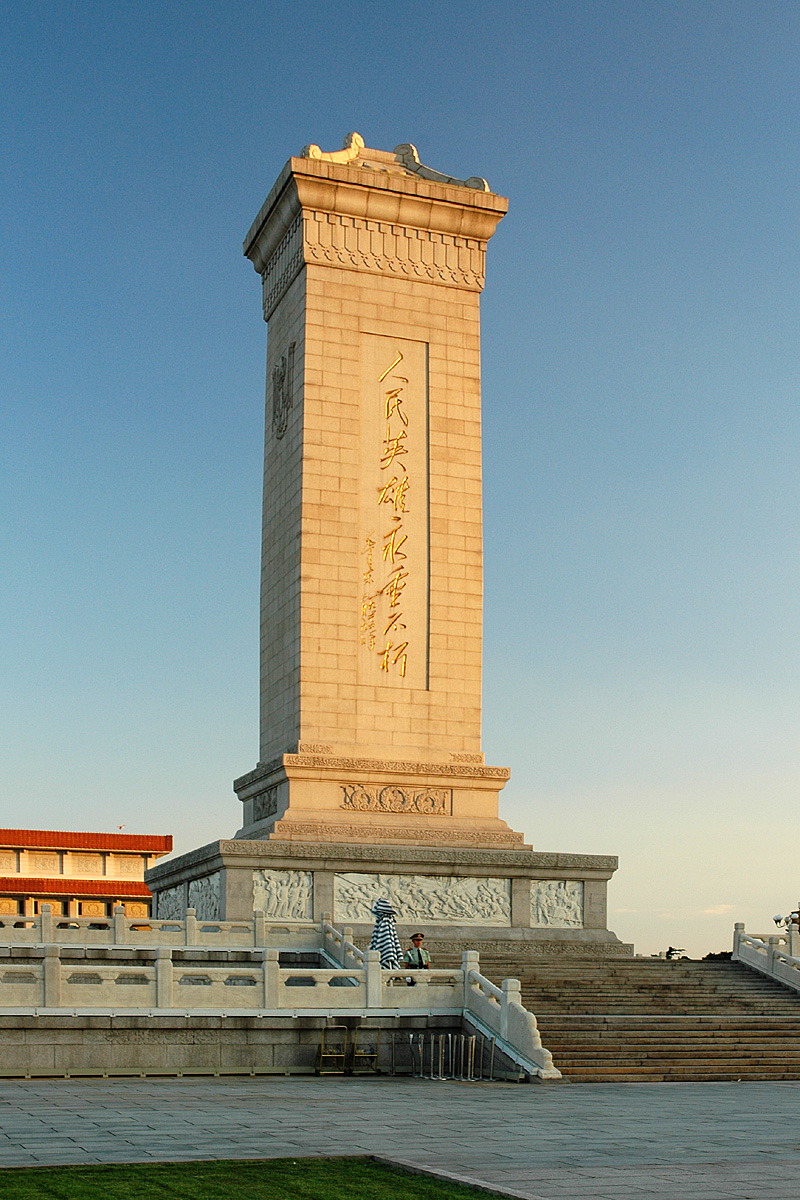

In 1949, the Beijing Municipal Urban Planning Committee solicited design proposals for the monument nationwide. Lin Huiyin and Liang Sicheng unanimously advocated that the design of the People's Heroes Monument should be based on the form of a stele, with the inscription as the central theme. In May 1952, Lin Huiyin, who participated in the design work, was appointed as a member of the People's Heroes Monument Construction Committee (hereinafter referred to as the Monument Construction Committee). In the design work of the People's Heroes Monument, Lin Huiyin not only undertook the task of art design but also became the actual leader of the entire design team in many cases, proposing principled opinions on the overall shape and structure of the monument.

Lin Huiyin undertook the organizational work of the design team and personally designed a complete set of decorative patterns for the base and body of the monument, especially a series of wreath reliefs on the small Xumi stele base. From the overall planning to the decorative patterns, Lin Huiyin carefully deliberated and studied each one. In terms of design style, Lin Huiyin advocated using the Tang Dynasty style, which can best represent the characteristics of Chinese traditional culture, as the blueprint.

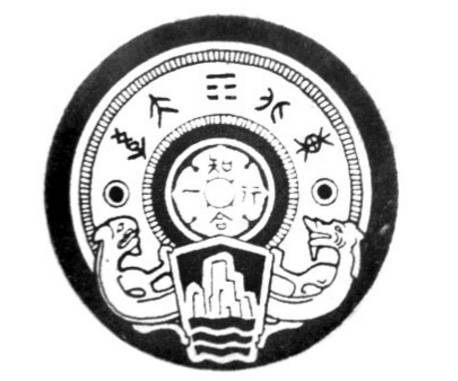

The Design of the Emblem at Northeastern University

In the late 1920s, Lin Huiyin, who was then an associate professor in the Department of Architecture at Northeastern University, participated in a competition for the design of the Northeastern University emblem initiated by Zhang Xueliang with a prize. Lin Huiyin's design of the "White Mountain and Black Water" pattern won the top prize in the competition.

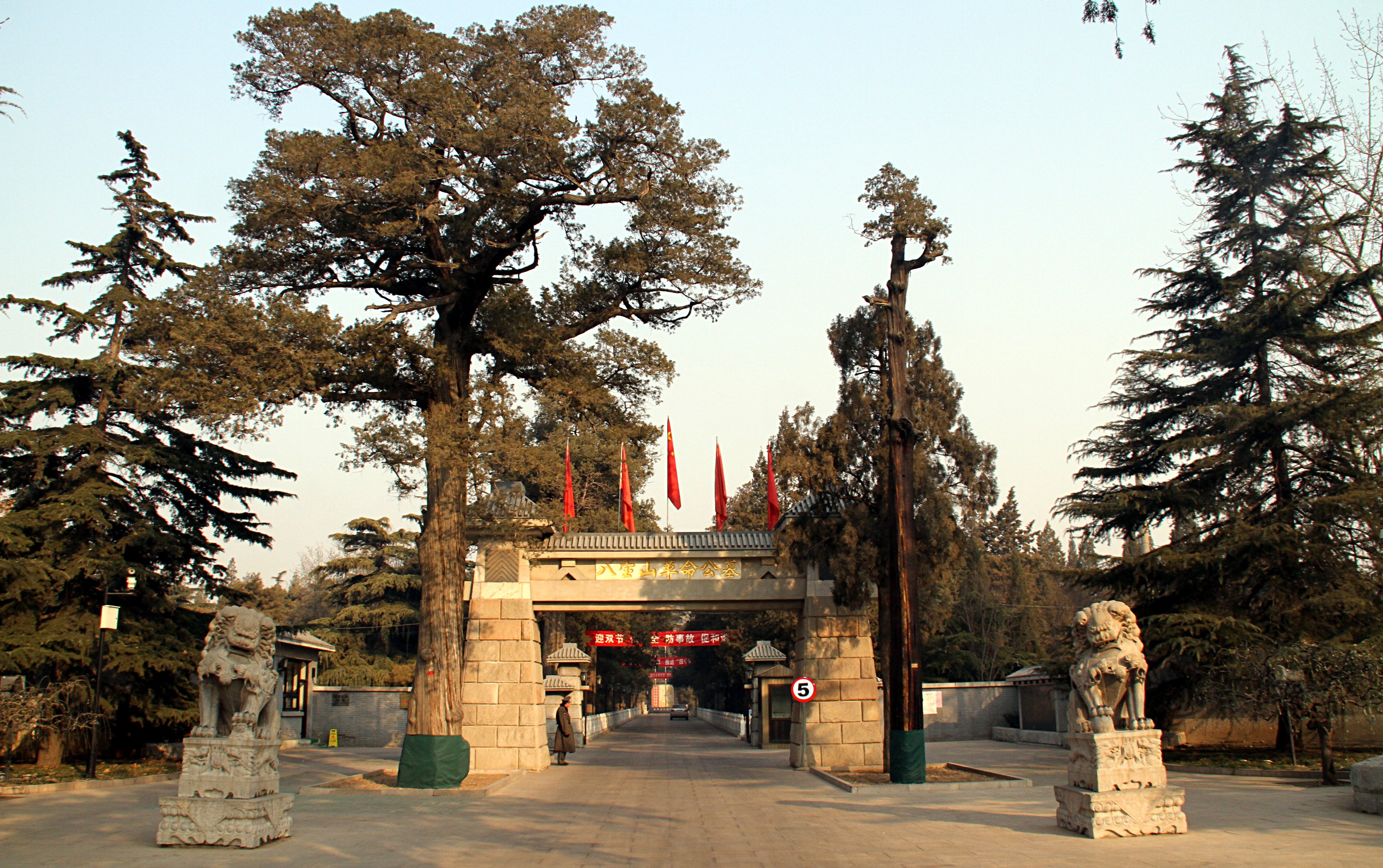

The Architectural Pattern of the Revolutionary Cemetery in Babaoshan

In 1950, the People's Government of Beijing transformed the Hu Guo Temple on Babaoshan into a cemetery, and in accordance with Zhou Enlai's opinion, the cemetery was named "Beijing Revolutionary Cemetery" as the burial place for revolutionary martyrs. The main architectural layout of the Babaoshan Revolutionary Cemetery was designed by the famous Chinese architect Lin Huiyin, divided into two parts: the tomb area and the columbarium. The cemetery is filled with green pines and cypresses, solemn and dignified, and is the final resting place for many revolutionary predecessors.

== Posthumous Commemoration ==
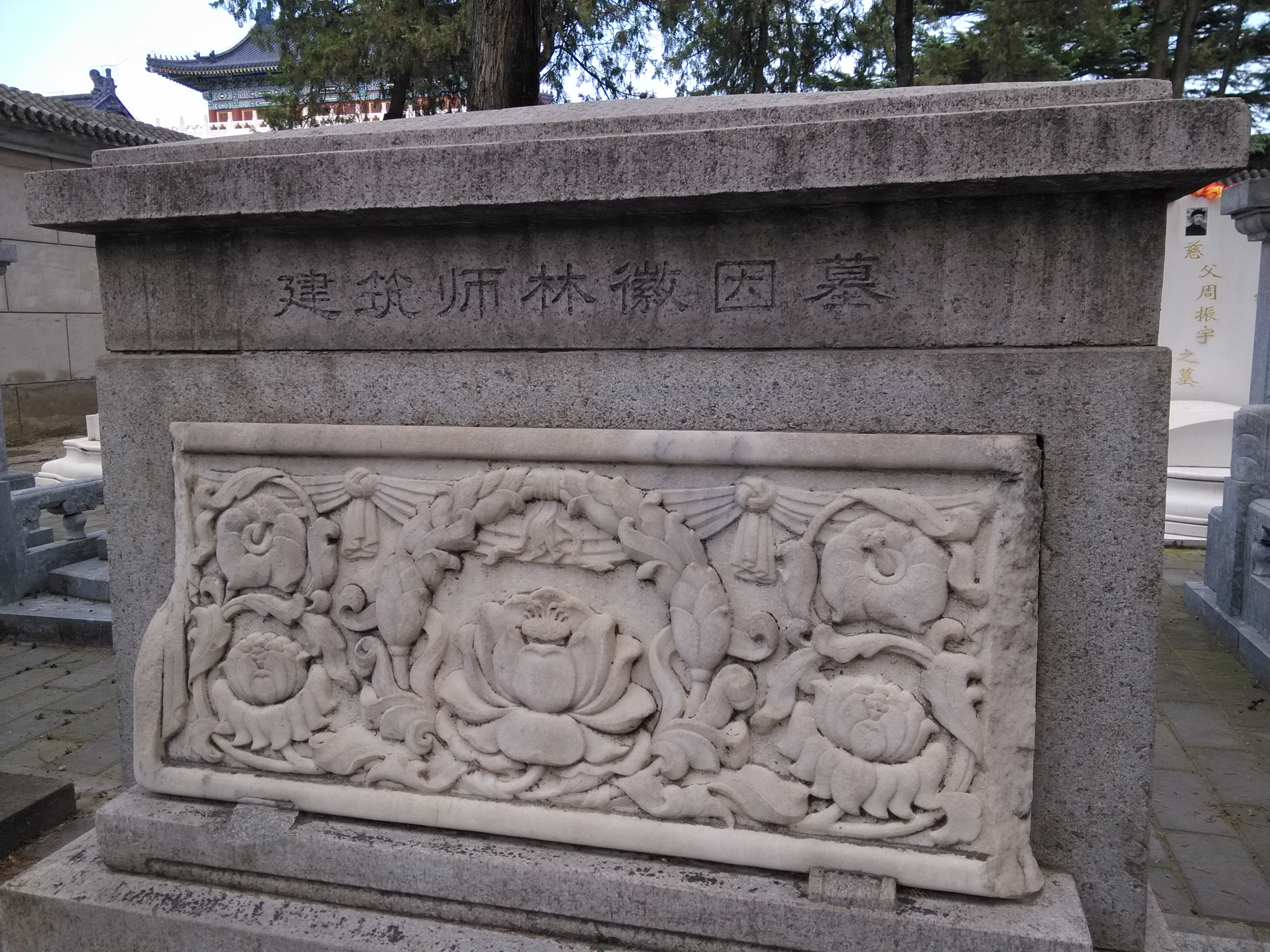

Tomb of Lin Huiyin

Every Qingming Festival, the tomb of Lin Huiyin in Babaoshan, Beijing, is always filled with fresh flowers. The tomb of Lin Huiyin was designed by Liang Sicheng, adorned with a white marble wreath, and features the patterns from the Monument to the People's Heroes in Tiananmen Square, which was designed by Lin Huiyin herself. The tombstone is inscribed with the words "Architect Lin Huiyin's Tomb" in a unique font from the Architecture Society. During the Cultural Revolution, these words were destroyed by the Red Guards, turning it into a "tomb without words." The tomb has since been restored. However, the original trial engraving patterns retrieved from the construction site of the Monument to the People's Heroes cannot be repaired.

== Character Evaluation ==
Overview

Lin Huiyin was a prominent figure in the history of modern Chinese culture and also the first female architect in China. Together with her husband Liang Sicheng, she dedicated her life to Chinese architecture and art. They jointly pioneered the research system of ancient Chinese architecture and co-founded the architecture departments at Northeastern University and Tsinghua University. They were the pioneers and founders of the study system of Chinese architectural history. Lin Huiyin not only achieved remarkable success in the field of architecture but also had astonishing literary accomplishments. Her writings are unique, full of poetry without losing scientific rigor; her essays are full of spirituality, and her poetry is widely popular. She was committed throughout her life to the pursuit of beauty, had a profound analysis of the aesthetic theory system, and made outstanding achievements in the field of arts and crafts through innovation and creation.

"The life of Liang Sicheng and Lin Huiyin was never a life of 'killing time'; for them, there were never enough days." (Comment by philosopher Jin Yuelin)

"An extraordinary first female architect of China, a brilliant scholar, she (Lin Huiyin) has such accomplishments in literature and art, and she is on par with Mr. Liang in architecture, making outstanding contributions together." (Comment by Tsinghua University Professor Wu Liangyong)

== Legacy ==
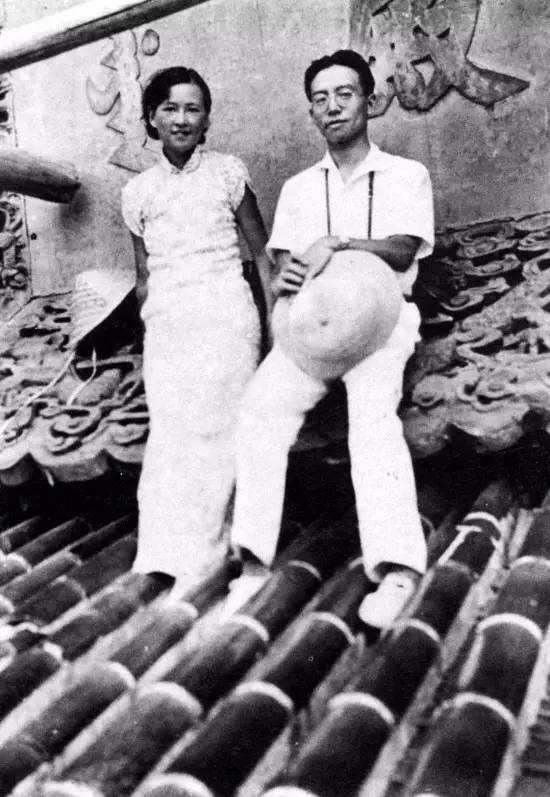
Liang Sicheng and Lin Huiyin in the Temple of Heaven

In October, 2010, as part of a revival of Lin Huiyin and her husband's life accomplishments, CCTV broadcast a six-hour, eight-episode documentary on the husband and wife. The documentary is titled Liang Sicheng Lin Huiyin and was directed by Hu Jingcao. Although Lin did not receive the recognition during her lifetime considering her gender, there is now a renewed revival of her legacy. It has been quoted of Lin Huiyin that "it is often only through the light given off by a man that we see the woman behind him, particularly so for young women in the arts who emerged from the republican era. But Lin Huiyin is an exception. In her, we see the reflection of many outstanding men of the time, but in fact it is she who adds extra color and shine to their images."

In 2018, the New York Times wrote a belated obituary for Lin Huiyin and her husband.

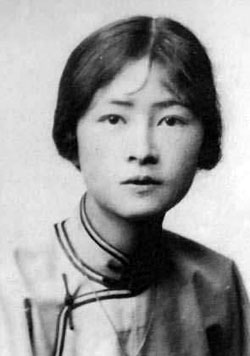
Young Lin Huiyin

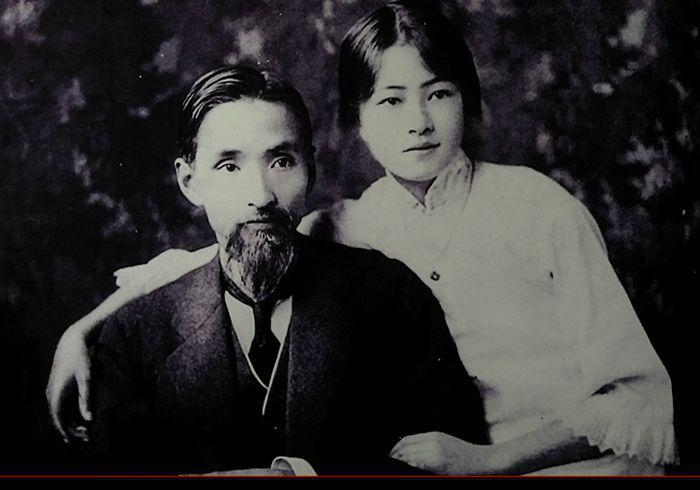
Lin Huiyin with her father Lin Changmin (zh:林長民)

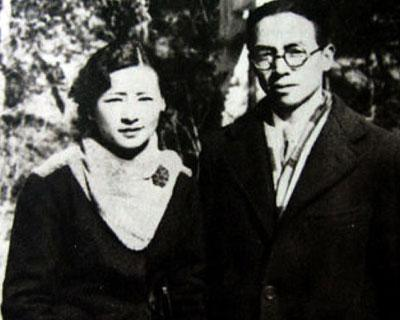
Lin Huiyin and Liang Sicheng

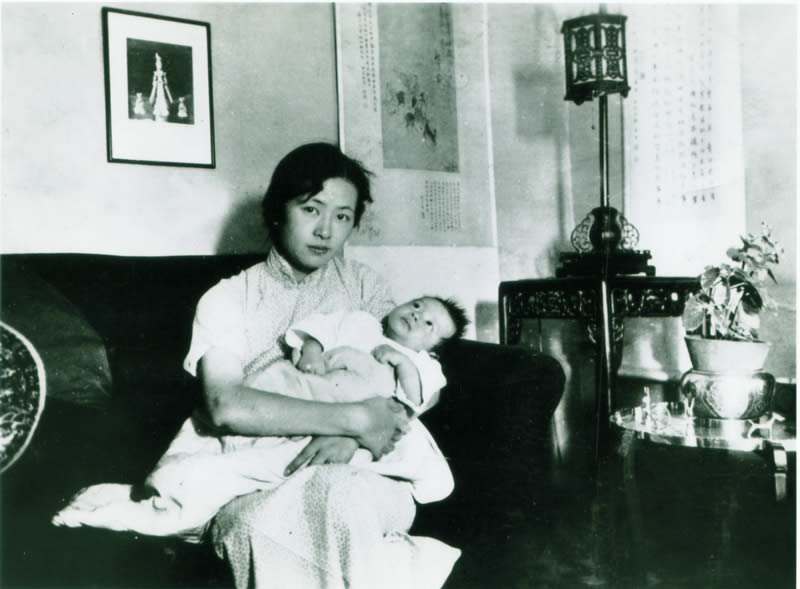
Lin Huiyin with her son Liang Congjie

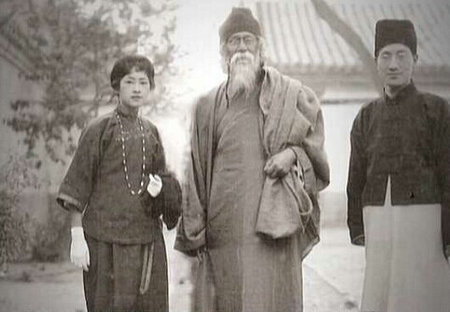
Lin Huiyin, Rabindranath Tagore and Xu Zhimo

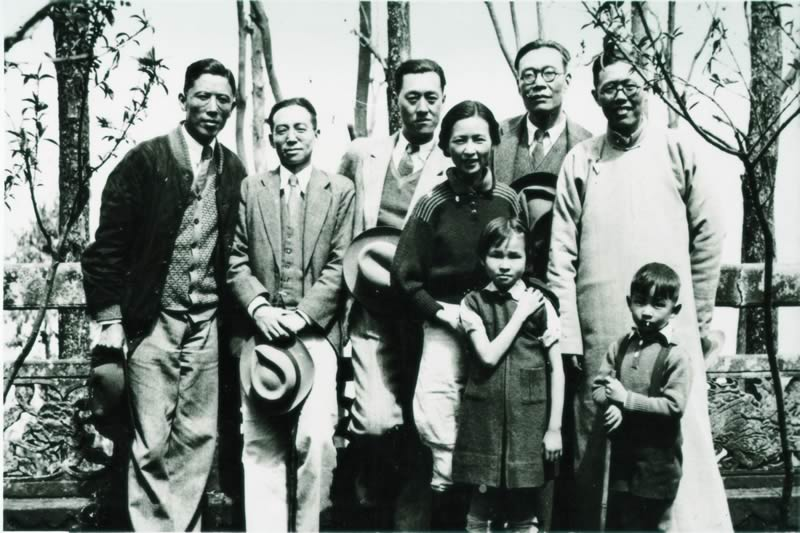
Liang Sicheng, Lin Huiyin, Zhou Peiyuan and others

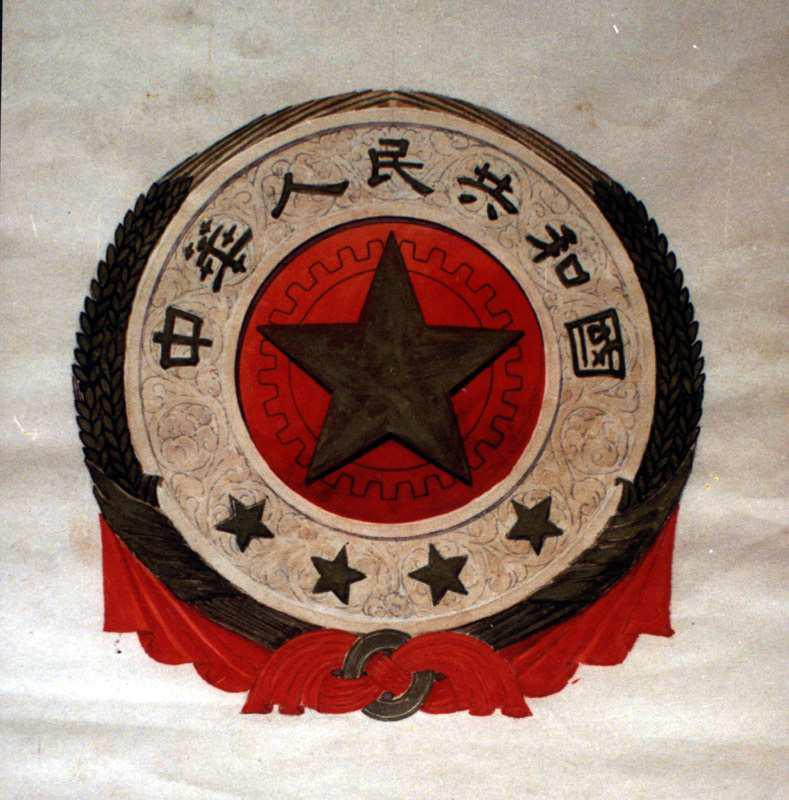
The jade disc design of the National Emblem of the People's Republic of China proposed by Lin Huiyin
