= Eastern and Western Pagodas =

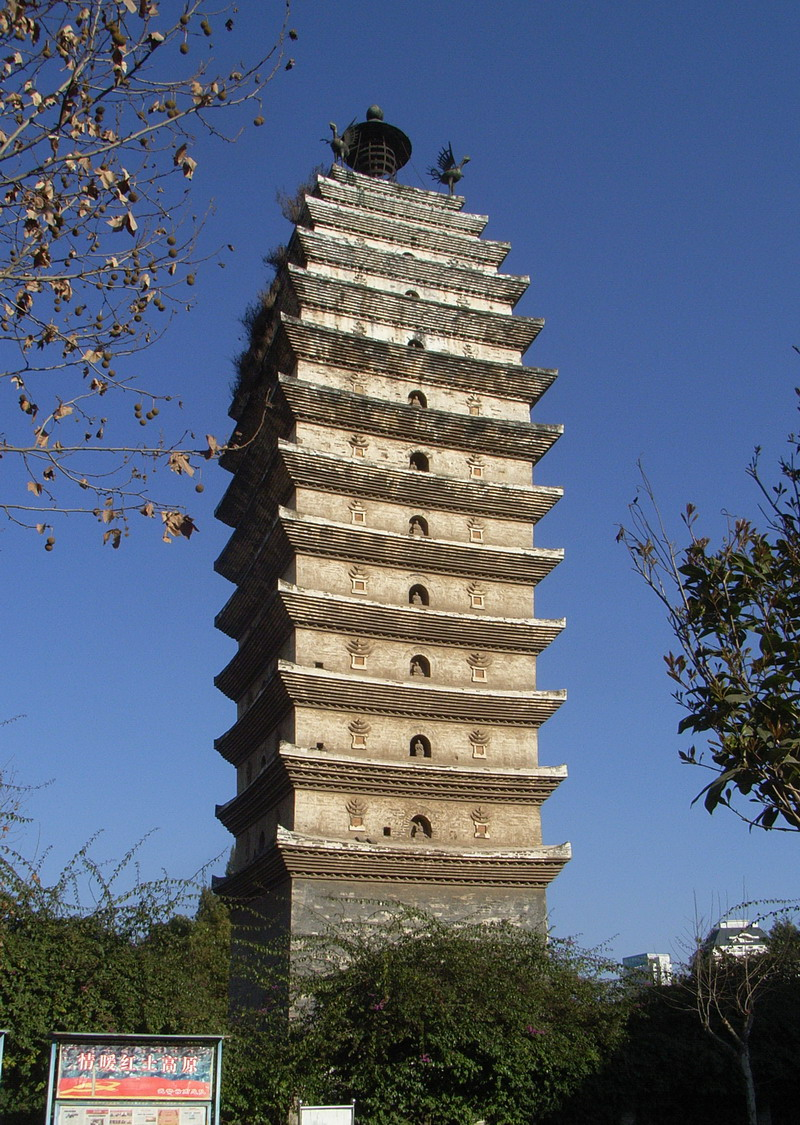
Eastern Pagoda (Dongsi Ta)

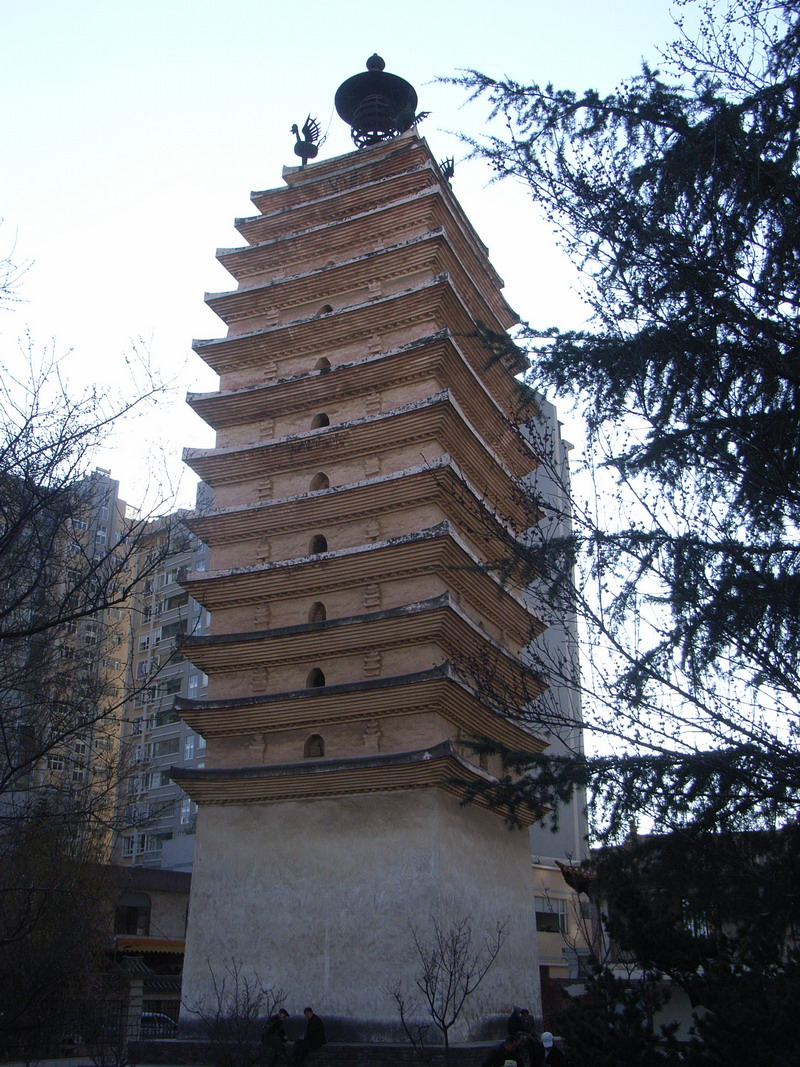
Western Pagoda (Xisi Ta)

The Eastern and Western Pagodas (东寺塔与西寺塔; Dongsi Ta / Xisi Ta) are two pagodas, about 200 metres (660 ft) apart, in the Xishan District of Kunming, Yunnan, China. Also known as the Pagoda of the East Temple (25.0320°N 102.7106°E) and the Pagoda of the West Temple (25.0319°N 102.7067°E), they were constructed in the late eighth or early ninth century AD, under the rule of the Kingdom of Nanzhao.
