= Beijing siheyuan =

Type of building in Beijing, China

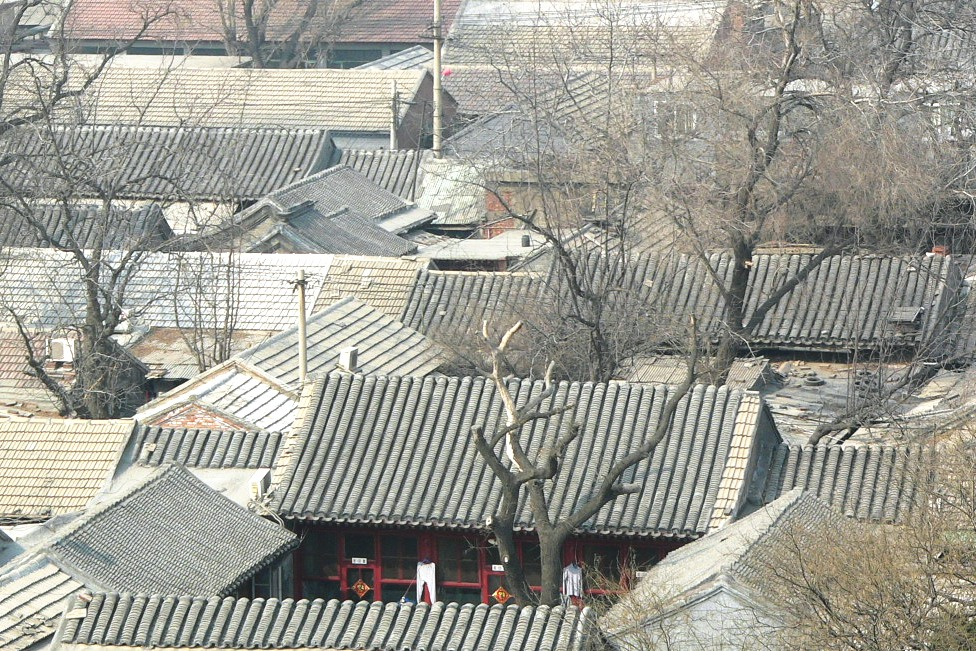
- Chinese: 北京四合院
Transcriptions
Standard Mandarin
- Hanyu Pinyin: Běijīng sìhéyuàn
- Tongyong Pinyin: Běijīng sìhéyuàn
Yue: Cantonese
- Jyutping: bak1 ging1 sei3 hap6 jyun2

Beijing siheyuan (Chinese: 北京四合院; pinyin: Běijīng sìhéyuàn) is a type of siheyuan (courtyard house) used in Beijing, China. The siheyuan originated in Beijing, and the Beijing siheyuan is the most common form of siheyuan. This, as well as the density of this architectural style within Beijing, cause the term "siheyuan" to mainly be associated with the Beijing style. Along with the hutong, this style of siheyuan has become representative of the traditional architecture of Beijing.

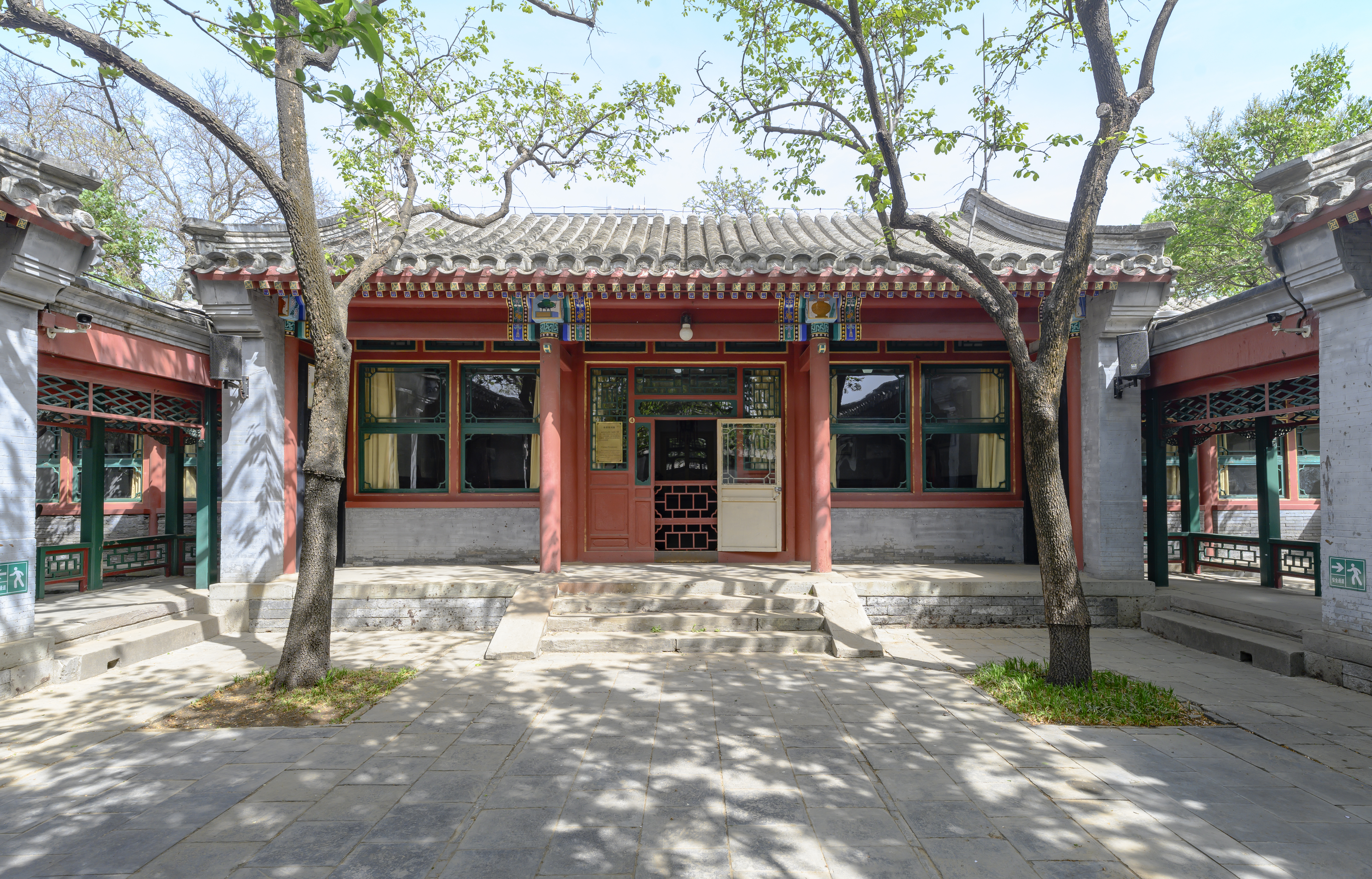
Main House of Mei Lanfang's Former Residence in Beijing

== Features of Beijing siheyuan ==
Like other forms of siheyuan, the basic structure of Beijing siheyuan involves the four structures within them surrounding the courtyard in the centre. Most hutongs in Beijing run east–west, causing most siheyuan in Beijing to be orientated north–south to allow for exit into the hutong. The gate of a Beijing siheyuan, instead of directly facing the main house, is usually situated on the southeast or northwest side of the siheyuan depending on which side of the structure the alley (hutong) is on.

Beijing siheyuan have courtyards that are very spacious and square, which contrasts with the style of siheyuan found in Shanxi. The structures surrounding the courtyard are separate from each other and are only connected by corridors. Architectural details such as gatehouses, screen walls, and door piers are also common characteristics of the Beijing style. There are several different gate formats which correspond to different siheyuan sizes, and most have relatively simple Qingshui roof ridges with few decorations.

== Quantity ==
There are no formal statistics on the number of siheyuans in different periods of history. The Qing Dynasty "Qianlong Capital Map" states that there were over 26,000 siheyuans in Beijing at the time. 1980s statistics from the Beijing Ancient Architecture Research Institute calculated over 6,000 siheyuans, 3,000 of which were in good condition. The "Beijing Siheyuan Chronicle" (2016), compiled by the Beijing Local Chronicles Compilation Committee Office, found a total of 923 well-preserved siheyuans. The "Beijing Siheyuan Chronicle" also counted the number of siheyuan in areas outside the Beijing urban area (specifically Haidian, Mentougou, Fangshan, Yanqing, Shunyi, Miyun) for the first time, and found nearly 200 well-preserved siheyuan structures.

== History ==
The architectural specifications of Beijing Siheyuan were initially formed as early as the Liao Dynasty. In 1276, after the construction of Dadu, the capital of the Yuan Dynasty, Kublai Khan issued an edict, relocating a portion of the population from the old Zhongdu city (southwest of Beijing) to the new Dadu city. High-ranking officials and wealthy individuals were given priority. Each household was allocated eight mu of land to build their own residences. This marked the beginning of the large-scale formation of traditional siheyuan houses in Beijing. In the early 1970s, the siheyuan ruins of the Yuan Dynasty unearthed in Houyingfang Hutong, Beijing, can be regarded as the prototype of Beijing Siheyuan. After evolving in the Ming and Qing dynasties, it gradually formed a unique architectural style.

After the founding of the People's Republic of China, especially after the Cultural Revolution, the original owners of the siheyuans were overthrown and their homes were confiscated and redistributed to accommodate multiple households due to the housing pressure of that era. Since it was not designed for multiple households, each family sharing the siheyuan residence built their own kitchen, storage hut and other facilities in the courtyard, and the siheyuan was reduced to a slum.

Some such confiscated siheyuans were well-preserved, usually because they were used as offices for companies and government bodies, losing their identity as residences. Some were transformed into hotels, such as the Haoyuan Hotel in Shijia Hutong and the Youhao Guesthouse in Houyuanensi Hutong.

Being shared by multiple households caused the siheyuans to fall into a state of lack of maintenance and disrepair, dilapidated houses have appeared in large number in Beijing's old urban area. In addition to the dilapidated houses, there is also the outdated infrastructure in the old city and the housing pressure caused by population growth. Beijing has started the overhaul of old and dangerous buildings. The government has combined upgrading of dilapidated housing with urban housing system reform, and introduced real estate developers for commercial development.

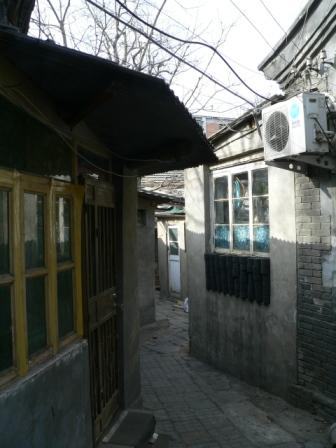
A courtyard packed with improvised huts

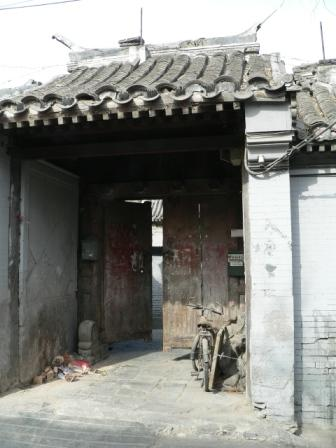
A dilapidated siheyuan

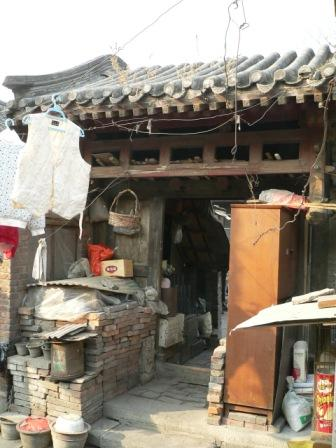
From the dusty, lackluster gate of a siheyuan on can still tell its past grandeur

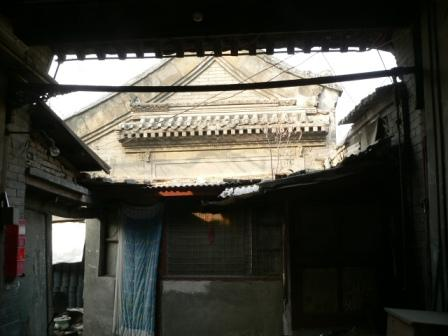
A grand screen wall covered by the shabby hut

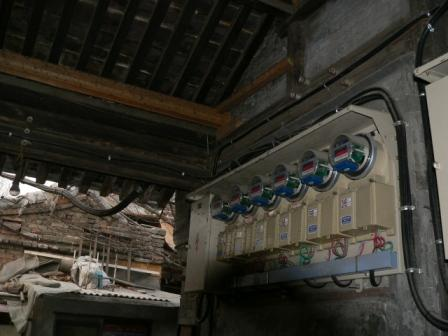
Electricity meters installed inside a siheyuan gate

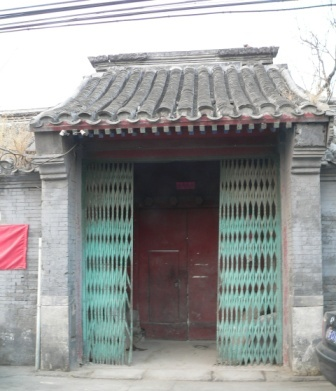
A folding security gate has been installed outside the once-elegant gate of the siheyuan

Urban development projects, such as expanding road networks, widening streets, and creating new green spaces, were all shrinking the footprint of siheyuan. Siheyuans have been demolished in large numbers, including former residences of notable figures, even some Qing prince's mansions. Some siheyuans were listed as protected courtyards at the Beijing municipal, district, and county levels, but even the preserved siheyuans are surrounded by high-rise buildings on all sides, becoming isolated islands in the modern city.

There are also some successful renovations of Beijing Siheyuan. In 1990, Professor Wu Liangyong of Tsinghua University presided over the renovation project of the siheyuans in Ju'er Hutong. The traditional siheyuan flat houses were adapted into multi-story modern buildings, incorporating kitchens, bathrooms, and other contemporary features while maintaining the original courtyard layout. The project won the United Nations World Habitat Award. In the renovation of the dangerous buildings in Nanchizi, some siheyuan houses were also converted into two-story buildings, and underground garages were incorporated. In 2006, Beijing released the "Illustrations of Architectural Elements of Beijing Siheyuan" as a reference for the protection, repair, reconstruction, and renovation of siheyuans.

== Tourism ==
Visiting Beijing's Hutongs and Siheyuans is one of the things to do in Beijing as a tourist However, most Siheyuans are residential houses and cannot be visited. Some open celebrity residences have become the main way to understand Siheyuans.

== Notability ==
The reason why Beijing's Siheyuan is famous is that its structure is unique and typical of traditional Chinese residential architecture. Most Chinese residential buildings are inner courtyard houses. The residential courtyards in the southern region are very small, and the houses on all sides are connected, which is called "a seal". This type of residence is suitable for the climatic conditions in the south, and the ventilation and lighting are ideal. The Siheyuan in Beijing has a spacious and airy courtyard, and the houses on all four sides are independent and connected by corridors. It is very convenient for living, pleasing to the eye, and very suitable for activities.

== Cultural connotation ==
Although Beijing Siheyuan is a residential building, it contains profound cultural connotations and is the carrier of Chinese traditional culture.

Its construction is very particular about Feng Shui. From site selection, and positioning to determining the specific scale of each building, it must be carried out according to Feng Shui theory. Beijing Siheyuan is famous all over the world. In old Beijing, in addition to the Forbidden City, royal gardens, temples and altars, and royal palaces, a large number of buildings were the countless houses of the people.

"Rixia Jiuwen Kao" quoted a poem by a Yuan Dynasty poet: "The clouds open the gates of the city for three thousand feet, and the fog darkens the towers and pavilions of millions of houses." The houses of these "millions of families" are what we now call Beijing Siheyuan.

== Architectural features ==
Beijing's regular courtyards are generally located in the east–west alleys and face south. The main gate is located in the southeast corner of the courtyard. In the middle of the courtyard is a spacious courtyard with trees and flowers planted in it, and goldfish are kept in a tank. It is the center of the courtyard layout and a place for people to walk, light, ventilate, cool off, rest, and do housework.

Medium-sized and small courtyards are generally the residences of ordinary residents, while large courtyards are used as mansions and government offices.

The carved patterns of the courtyards are mainly various auspicious patterns, such as "Fu Shou Shuang Quan" composed of bats and longevity characters, "Four Seasons of Peace" with vases containing roses, "Descendants for Generations", "Three Friends of Winter", "Yu Tang Fugui", "Fu Lu Shou Xi", etc., showing the old Beijingers' yearning for a better life.

The courtyards are generally occupied by one household, but there are also cases where multiple households live in the same courtyard, mostly poor families, called "Da Za Yuan". The warmth of the Da Za Yuan is unforgettable for many old Beijing residents.

The decoration, carvings, and paintings of the courtyard house reflect folk customs and traditional culture, and show people's pursuit of happiness, beauty, wealth, and auspiciousness under certain historical conditions.

== Examples ==
=== Former residences of celebrities ===
- Ji Xiaolan's former residence is located at No. 241, Zhushikou West Street, Xicheng District.
- Chongli's former residence is located at No. 63, No. 65, Dongsiliutiao, Dongcheng District
- Wanrong's former residence is located at No. 35, No. 37, Maoer Hutong, Dongcheng District.
- Mao Dun's former residence is located at No. 13, Houyuanen Temple Hutong, Jiaodaokou.
- Lu Xun's former residence is located in the courtyard of Lu Xun Memorial Hall, No. 21, Fuchengmennei Xisan Tiao.
- Lao She's former residence is located at No. 19, Fuqiang Hutong, Dengshikou West Street, Dongcheng District.
- Chen Duxiu's former residence is located at No. 20, Jiangan Hutong, Beichizi Street, Dongcheng District
- Guo Moruo's former residence is located at Qianhai West Street, Shichahai.
- Mei Lanfang's former residence is located at No. 9, Huguosi Street, Xicheng District
- Kuijun's former residence is located at No. 15, Shajing Hutong, Dongcheng District
- Zhang Tingge's former residence is located at No. 87, Xijiaominxiang, Xicheng District

=== Courtyard hotels ===
- Zhuyuan Hotel
- Lvsongyuan Hotel
- Beijing Yanweizhuang Siheyuan Hotel
- Haoyuan Hotel
- Central Hall Guest House

=== Courtyard houses listed as cultural relics protection units ===
- Siheyuan No. 112 Beixinhua Street
- Siheyuan No. 23, Liutiao, Xisi North Street, Xicheng District
- Siheyuan No. 11, Xisi North 3rd Street, Xicheng District
- Siheyuan No. 19, Xisi North 3rd Street, Xicheng District
- Siheyuan No. 15, Qiangongyong Hutong, Xicheng District
- Siheyuan No. 129, Lishi Hutong, Dongcheng District
- Siheyuan No. 11, Neiwubu Street, Dongcheng District
- Siheyuan No. 7, Houyuanen Temple Hutong, Dongcheng District
- Siheyuan No. 2, Guoxiang Hutong, Dongcheng District
- Siheyuan No. 13, 15, Fangjia Hutong, Dongcheng District
- Dongcheng Siheyuan No. 36 Qufuxue Hutong (including No. 136 Jiaodaokou South Street)
- Siheyuan No. 24 Xinkailu Road, Dongcheng District
- Siheyuan No. 25-37 Xitangzi Hutong
- Siheyuan No. 5 Maoer Hutong
- Siheyuan No. 11 Maoer Hutong
- Siheyuan No. 25 Meishuguan East Street
- Siheyuan No. 15 Dongmianhua Hutong and archway brick carvings
- Siheyuan No. 7 and No. 9 Qian Gulouyuan Hutong
- Siheyuan No. 255 Gulou East Street
- Siheyuan No. 13 Heizhima Hutong
- Siheyuan No. 7 Qianyongkang Hutong
