= Liang Sicheng =

Chinese architect

- 梁思成
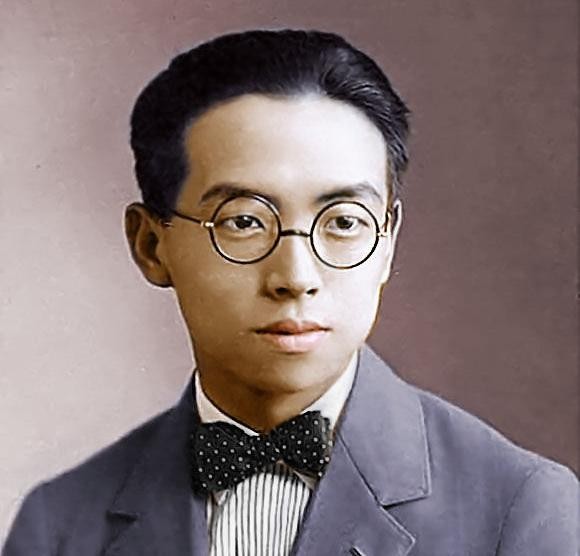
- Liang (before 1949).
- Born: 20 April 1901; Tokyo, Japan
- Died: 9 January 1972 (aged 70); Beijing, People's Republic of China
- Education: Tsinghua University; University of Pennsylvania (MArch)
- Spouse(s): Lin Huiyin; Lin Zhu
- Children: Liang Congjie; Liang Zaibing
- Parent: Liang Qichao

Chinese name
- Chinese: 梁思成
Transcriptions
Standard Mandarin
- Hanyu Pinyin: Liáng Sīchéng
- Wade–Giles: Liang^{2} Ssŭ^{1}-ch'êng^{2}
- IPA: [ljǎŋ sɹ̩́.ʈʂʰə̌ŋ]
Yue: Cantonese
- Yale Romanization: Lèuhng Sīsìhng
- Jyutping: Loeng4 Si1-sing4
- IPA: [lœŋ˩ si˥sɪŋ˩]

Liang Sicheng (20 April 1901 – 9 January 1972) was a Chinese architect and architectural historian, known as the father of modern Chinese architecture. His father, Liang Qichao, was one of the most prominent Chinese scholars of the early 20th century. His wife was the architect and poet Lin Huiyin. His younger brother, Liang Siyong, was one of China's first archaeologists.

Liang authored the first modern history on Chinese architecture, and he was the founder of the Architecture Department of Northeastern University in 1928 and Tsinghua University in 1946. He was the Chinese representative of the Design Board which designed the United Nations headquarters in New York City. He, along with wife Lin Huiyin, Mo Zongjiang, and Ji Yutang, discovered and analyzed the first and second oldest timber structures still standing in China, located at Nanchan Temple and Foguang Temple at Mount Wutai.

He is recognized as the "Father of Modern Chinese Architecture". Princeton University, which awarded him an honorary doctoral degree in 1947, issued a statement praising him as "a creative architect who has also been a teacher of architectural history, a pioneer in historical research and exploration in Chinese architecture and planning, and a leader in the restoration and preservation of the priceless monuments of his country."

== Early life ==
Liang Sicheng was born on 20 April 1901 in Tokyo, Japan, where his father, prolific scholar and reformist Liang Qichao, was in exile from China after the failed Hundred Days' Reform. During the waning years of the Qing dynasty, China's last imperial dynasty, the empire endured a series of foreign invasions and domestic struggles, beginning with the first Opium War in 1840. In 1898 the Guangxu Emperor, led by a circle of advisers, attempted to introduce drastic reforms to bring China onto the path to modernity. Liang was a leader of this movement. However, in the face of opposition from conservatives in the Qing court, the movement failed. The Empress Dowager Cixi, the emperor's adoptive mother and the power behind the throne, imprisoned the emperor and executed many of the movement's leaders. Liang Qichao took refuge in Japan, where his eldest son was born.

After the Qing dynasty fell in 1911, Liang Sicheng's father returned to China from his exile in Japan. He briefly served in the government of the newly established Republic, which was taken over by a faction of warlords in Northern China (the "Beiyang clique"). Liang Qichao quit his government post and initiated a social and literary movement to introduce modern, Western thought to Chinese society.

Liang Sicheng was educated by his father in this progressive environment. In 1915, Liang entered Tsinghua College, a preparatory school in Beijing. (This college later became Tsinghua University.) In 1924, he and Lin went to University of Pennsylvania funded by the Boxer Indemnity Scholarship Program to study architecture under Paul Cret. Three years later, Liang received his master's degree in architecture. He greatly benefited from his education in America, which also prepared him for his future career as a scholar and professor in China.

In 1928, Liang married Lin Huiyin (known in English as Phyllis Lin), who had studied with him at the University of Pennsylvania and became an equally renowned scholar. She was recognized as an artist, architect and poet, admired by and friends with several famous scholars of her time, such as poet Xu Zhimo (with whom she also had a brief relationship), philosopher Jin Yuelin and economist Chen Daisun.

== Career ==
When the couple went back in 1928, they were invited by the Northeastern University in Shenyang. At that time Shenyang was under the control of Japanese troops, which was a big challenge to perform any professional practice. They went anyway, established the second School of Architecture in China, but also the first curriculum which took a western one (to be precise the curriculum from the University of Pennsylvania) as its prototype. Their effort was interrupted by Japan's occupation in the following year, but after 18 years, in 1946, the Liangs were again able to practice their professorship in Tsinghua University in Beijing. This time a more systematic and all-around curriculum was discreetly put forward, consisting of courses of fine arts, theory, history, science, and professional practice. This has become a reference for any other school of architecture later developed in China. This improvement also reflected the change of architectural style from the Beaux-Arts tradition to the modernist Bauhaus style since the 1920s.

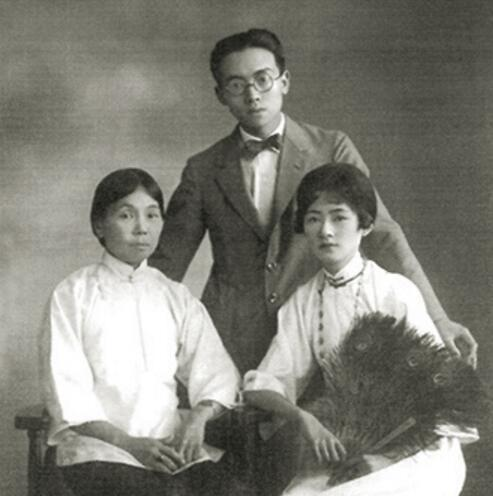
Liang Sicheng and Lin Huiyin in 1928

In 1930, Liang and his colleague, Zhang Rui, won an award for the physical plan of Tianjin. This plan incorporates contemporary American techniques in zoning, public administration, government finance, and municipal engineering. Liang's involvement in city planning was further inspired by Clarence Stein, the chairman of the Regional Planning Association of America. They met in Beiping in 1936 during Stein's trip to Asia. Liang and Stein became good friends and in Liang's visit to the US in 1946/7, Liang stayed in Stein's apartment when he came to New York City. Stein played an instrumental role in the establishment of the architectural and planning program at Tsinghua University.

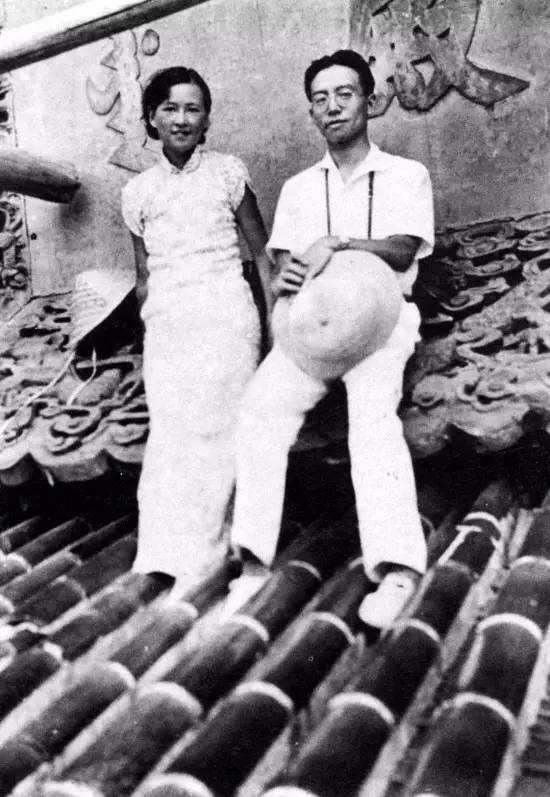
Liang Sicheng and Lin Huiyin in the Temple of Heaven in 1935

In 1931, Liang became a member of a newly developed organization in Beijing called the Society for Research in Chinese Architecture. He felt a strong impulse to study Chinese traditional architecture and that it was his responsibility to interpret and convey its building methods. It was not an easy task. Since the carpenters were generally illiterate, methods of construction were usually conveyed orally from master to apprentice and were regarded as secrets within every craft. In spite of these difficulties, Liang started his research by "decoding" classical manuals and consulting the workmen who have the traditional skills. From the start of his new career as a historian, Liang was determined to search and discover what he termed the Grammar of Chinese architecture. He recognized that throughout China's history the timber-frame had been the fundamental form of construction. He also realized that it was far from enough just to sit in his office day and night engaged in the books. He had to get out searching for the surviving buildings in order to verify his assumptions. His first travel was in April 1932. In the following years he and his colleagues successively identified traditional buildings of considerable age, including the Foguang Temple (857), the Temple of Solitary Joy (984), the Yingzhou Pagoda (1056), Zhaozhou Bridge (589-617), and many others. Because of their effort, these buildings managed to survive.

Following the Mukden Incident in 1931, Imperial Japan began establishing strangleholds throughout China's north, ultimately culminating into Second Sino-Japanese War, which forced Liang Sicheng and Lin Huiyin to cut short their cultural restoration work in Beijing, and flee southward along with faculty and materials of the Architectural Department of Northeastern University. Liang and Lin along with their children and their university continued their studies and research work in temporary settlements in the cities of Tianjin, Kunming, and finally in Lizhuang.

During the later stages of World War II, the Americans began heavy bombing of the Japanese homeland. Liang, whose brother-in-law Lin Heng served as a fighter pilot in the Chinese air force and died in the air war against Japan, recommended that the Americans military authorities spare the ancient Japanese cities of Kyoto and Nara:

Architecture is the epitome of society and the symbol of the people. But it does not belong to one person, for it is the crystallization of the entire human race. Nara's Toshodaiji Temple is the world's oldest wood-structure building. Once destroyed, it is irrecoverable.

After the war, Liang was invited to establish the architectural and urban planning programs at Tsinghua University. In 1946, he went to Yale University as a visiting fellow and served as the Chinese representative in the design of the United Nations Headquarters Building. In 1947, Liang received an honorary doctoral degree from Princeton University. He visited major architectural programs and influential architects in order to develop a model program at Tsinghua before returning to China.

== Works ==
To spread and share his understandings and appreciation of Chinese architecture, and most importantly, to help save its diminishing building technologies, Liang published his first book, Qing Structural Regulations in 1934. The book was on the study of the methods and rules of Qing architecture with the 1734 Qing Architecture Regulation and several other ancient manuals as the textbook, the carpenters as teachers, and the Forbidden City in Beijing as teaching material. Since its publication, for more than seven decades, this book has become a standard textbook for anyone who wants to understand the essence of ancient Chinese architecture. Liang considered the study of Qing Structural Regulation as a stepping stone to the much more daunting task of studying the Song dynasty Yingzao Fashi (Treatise on Architectural Methods), due to the large number of specialist terms used in that manual differing substantially from the Qing dynasty architectural terminology.

Liang's study of Yingzao Fashi spanned more than two decades, from 1940 to 1963, and the first draft of his Annotated Yingzao Fashi was completed in 1963. However, due to the eruption of the Cultural Revolution in China, the publication of this work was cut short. Liang's Annotated Yingzao Fashi was published posthumously by Tsinghua University Architecture Department's Yingzao Fashi Study Group in 1980. (The text occupies all of Volume 7 in his ten-volume Collected Works.)

Liang considered the Yingzao Fashi and Qing Structural Regulations as "two grammar books of Chinese architecture." He wrote, "both government manuals, they are of the greatest importance for the study of the technological aspects of Chinese architecture."

Another book, History of Chinese Architecture, was "the first thing of its kind". In his words, this book was "an attempt to organize the materials collected by myself and other members of the Institute during the past twelve years." He had divided the previous 3,500 years into six architectural periods, defined each period by references to historical and literary citations, described existing monuments of each period, and finally analyzed the architecture of each period as evidenced from a combination of painstaking library and field research. All of these books became the platform for later scholars to explore the principles and evolution of Chinese architecture, and are still considered classics today.

Liang's posthumous manuscript Chinese Architecture: A Pictorial History, written in English, edited by Wilma Fairbank, was published by MIT Press in 1984 and won ForeWord Magazine's Architecture "Book of the Year" Award.

=== Restoration works ===
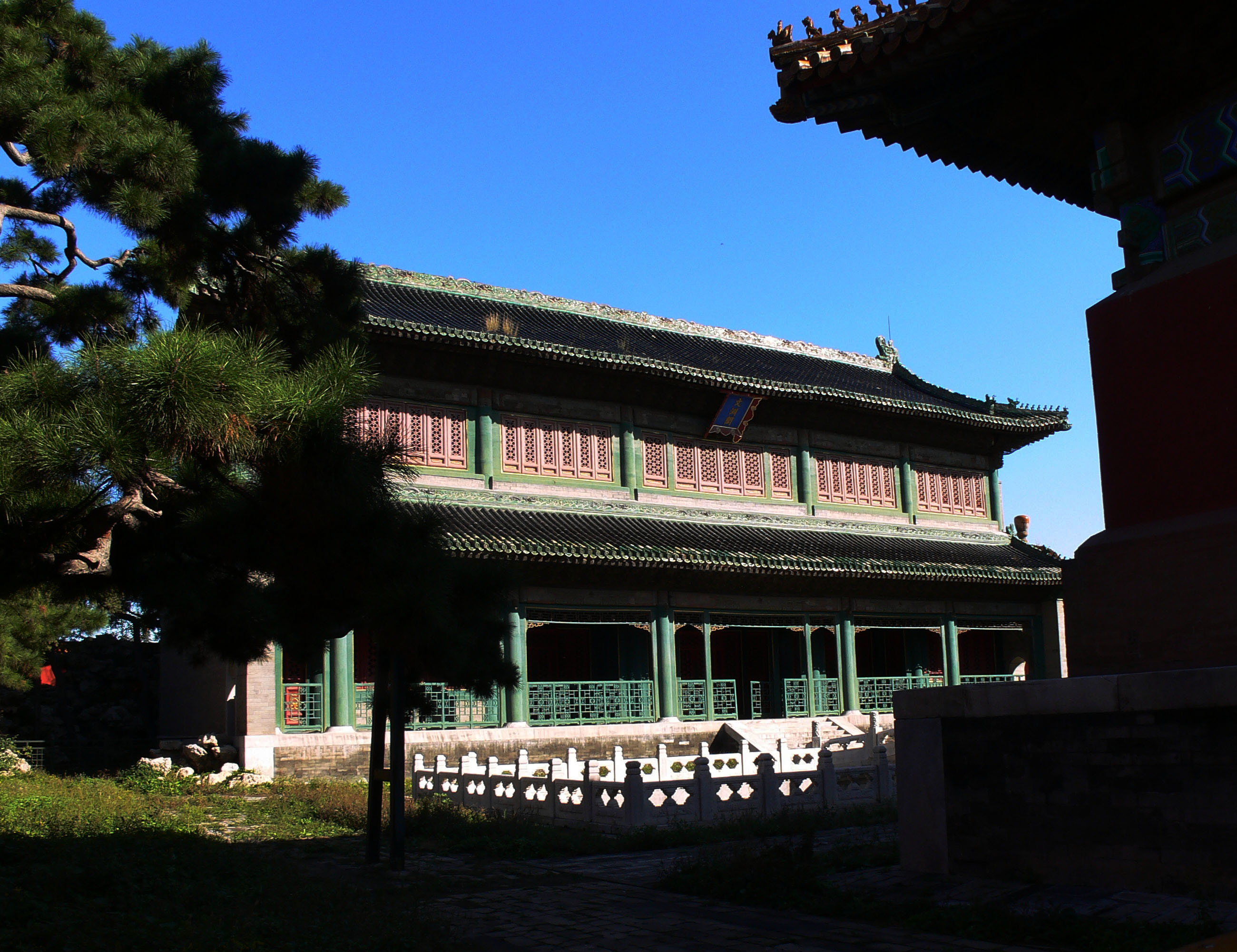
The Belvedere of Literary Profundity in the Forbidden City

Liang's first experience participating in the restoration of an old building was in 1932, when he was asked to restore a two-story imperial library, the Belvedere of Literary Profundity, erected in 1776 in the southwestern part of the Forbidden City. In 1935, he was selected as the advisor of the restoration project of the Temple of Confucius. In his proposal he expressed his attitude toward historic buildings. He said, "in the face of all the old buildings dating from different periods of time, it is our responsibility to protect and restore them. Before starting our work, we need to carefully look into its background, to fix it in a rational way in order to extend its existence for as long as possible."

=== Design works ===
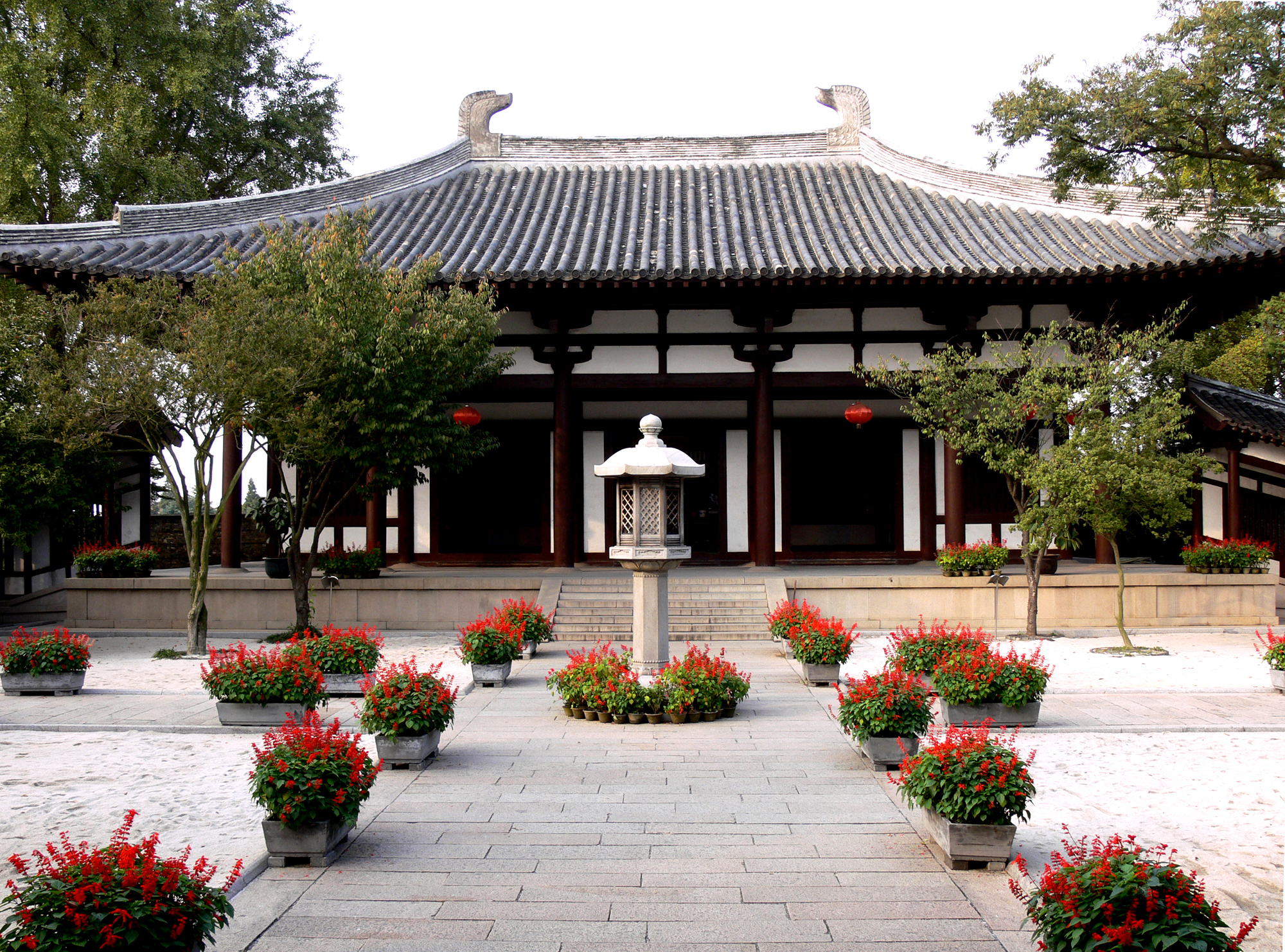
Monk Ganjin memorial Hall, Yangzhou, designed by Liang Sicheng

- Monument of Wang Guowei, 1929
- Hall and Library in Jilin Provincial University, 1930
- Geological Building and female dormitory Peking University, 1934-1935

In around 1950, when he and his wife were both appointed to the groups designing the new national emblem. They urged that the emblem should have Chinese characteristics, not a hammer and sickle. They succeeded and in the end a representation of the façade of the Tiananmen in red and gold became the emblem that is still used today. In 1951, they were commissioned to design the Monument to the People's Heroes, which was to be erected in the center of the Tiananmen Square. Liang's advice that it should resemble the stone memorial stele universally found throughout China swayed the design group.

- Tomb of Ren Bishi, 1952
- Tomb of Lin Huiyin, 1955
- Jianzhen memorial hall, 1963

=== The National Style ===
When Liang was later given the responsibility to develop a national style of architecture by the Chinese Communist Party, his intention was to pass on the essence of Chinese architecture with a combination of Western know-how. This specific "essence", incorporated a "large roof", similar to the temple-style concave curved roofs with overhanging eaves to denote their Chinese origin. Though he was severely criticized for this during political campaigns, a wave of the National Style had already spread out, proliferated and sponsored by the National Government, and even continued to be influential after one or two decades. Famous examples include the China Fine Arts Gallery (1959), the National Library of China (1987), and Beijing west railway station (1996), which are all typical of their large roofs.

=== Urban planning of Beijing ===
Liang sought to preserve the historical city of Beijing, but ultimately this view was rejected by leaders including Mao Zedong, who viewed Beijing as an important administrative area and socialist political symbol.

In 1950, after he was committed as the vice director in Beijing City Planning Committee. Liang and another planner Chen Zhanxiang worked together for the new government and eventually submitted a report "Suggestions on the location of central government district", which is referred as the "Liang-Chen Proposal" in the Chinese architectural field. In this proposal, Liang Sicheng and Chen Zhanxiang proposed different locations for the city center to the west of the Forbidden City, east of Gongzhufen and west of Yuetan. They listed their arguments in the "Suggestions on the location of central government district", which could also be seen in the letter Liang wrote to the Prime Minister of China Zhou Enlai at that time. They insisted that the city should be a political and cultural center, not an industrial zone. By putting the city center a significant distance from the ancient Inner City, they hoped to reduce the demographic and logistical pressure in the Inner City, which in turn may allow for the preservation of its historical city wall.

After months of deliberations, the proposal was rejected; party leaders including Mao and Liu Shaoqi weighed in and confirmed that the administrative center would be located in the Inner City. The inner city wall was demolished piecemeal beginning in 1952, to allow for roads and other infrastructure needs.

== Publications ==
- Herbert George Wells, The Outline of History, transl. Liang Sicheng, 1932, (世界史纲)
- Qing Structural Regulations, 1934, Society for Research in Chinese Architecture (清式营造则例)
- History of Chinese Sculpture, 1985, China Architecture & Building Press (中国雕塑史)
- Architecture History in China, 1998, ISBN 978-7-5306-4168-2 (中国建筑史)
- A Pictorial History of Chinese Architecture: A Study of the Development of its Structural System and the Evolution of its Types, edited by Wilma Fairbank. MIT Press, 1984, ISBN 978-0-262-12103-3
- Complete Works of Liang Sicheng, 2004, China Architecture & Building Press (梁思成全集)
- A Pictorial illusion on principle in Qing Architecture, 1981, ISBN 978-7-302-13229-5, Tsinghua University Press (清工部《工程做法则例》图解)
- Footnote on Yingzao Fashi, 1981, China Architecture & Building Press (营造法式注释)

== Cultural Revolution ==
Liang was targeted on ideological grounds for his theory of architecture which promoted traditional Chinese architecture; he was accused of "thinking that the Communist Party did not understand architecture", with traditional design being a "phenomenon of waste in construction". In 1955, the volume of criticisms exacted a severe mental toll on Liang and Lin Huiyin. Lin Huiyin died in April 1955 from tuberculosis, having lived many years longer than the medical prognosis. In 1956, Liang was forced to self-criticize; his "mistakes" were deemed to be academic rather than political. Open criticism against Liang and his support for a new China with a "national character" ended as attention shifted to academics of philosophy and social sciences like Hu Shih, Hu Feng, and Liang Shuming.

Liang's standing improved a few years later when his ideas on traditional design became acceptable and widely published again. He regained his position as Director of Architecture at Tsinghua University, conducted more surveys on ancient architectural structures, and completed the Annotated Yingzao Fashi. He married Lin Zhu, another Tsinghua faculty member, in 1962. He was persecuted again during the Cultural Revolution as "an authority of counter-revolutionary scholarship"; his university colleagues were sent to rural regions as part of the "Down to the Countryside Movement". Liang and Lin Zhu hid his documents, including Annotated Yingzao Fashi, to avoid possible confiscation or destruction by the Red Guards. He died in Beijing in 1972. In 1973, Lin Zhu recovered the papers for publication as A Complete Collection of Liang Sicheng's Works; she also wrote Bewildered Thoughts of a Great Master, Architect Liang Sicheng, and History and Society for the Study of Chinese Architecture.

== Rehabilitation ==
Liang was rehabilitated posthumously after the end of the Cultural Revolution. On 20 November 1992, China Post issued a stamp commemorating Liang Sicheng as part of the third set of its "Modern Chinese Scientists" stamp series (serial number 1992-19). 54 million copies were printed.
