= Yuantong Temple =

Buddhist temple in Yunnan, China

- 圆通寺
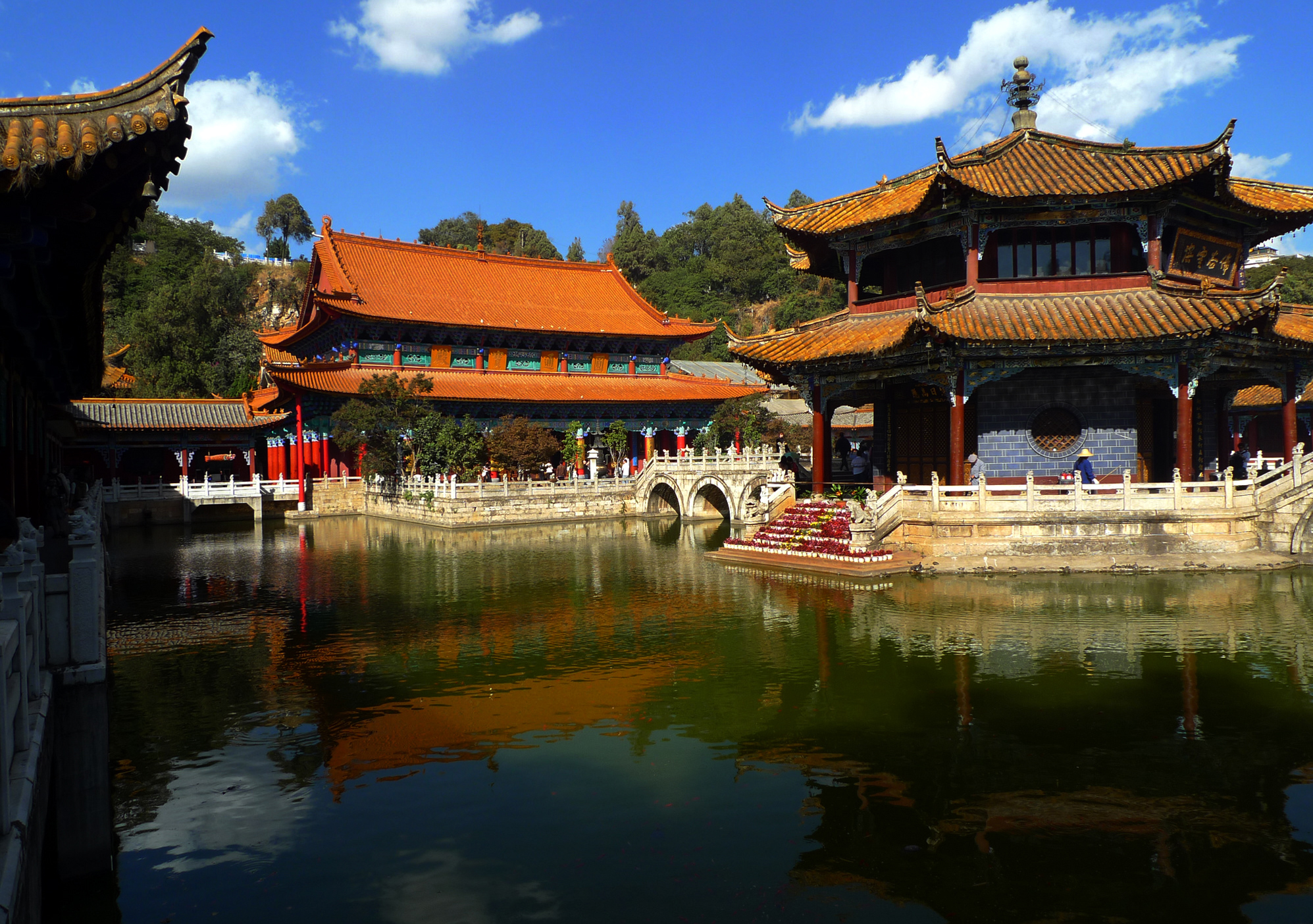
- Yuantong Temple

- Location within Yunnan Location within China

Religion
- Affiliation: Buddhism

Location
- Location: Kunming, Yunnan
- Country: China
- Coordinates: 25°03′18″N 102°42′37″E

Architecture
- Style: Chinese architecture
- Established: Tang dynasty

Yuantong Temple (simplified Chinese: 圆通寺; traditional Chinese: 圓通寺; pinyin: Yuántōng Sì) is an ancient Buddhist temple in Kunming, Yunnan, China. It is located in a protected natural depression and in recent years it has been expanded with funding from Thailand. In the 1950s, it hosted a grand ceremony to greet and send on the sacred teeth of the Buddha and so became important in Southeast Asia.

== History ==
It was first built in the late 8th and early 9th century, the time of the Nanzhao Kingdom in the Tang dynasty. After two major restorations and expansion in the regin of Emperor Chenghua (1465–1487) and in 1686, the temple took on its present design, with covered corridors, bridges and grand halls.

== Architecture ==
The extant buildings include the Yuantong Wonderful Realm (圆通胜境坊), Octagonal Pavilion (八角亭), Yuantong Hall (圆通殿), Copper Buddha Hall (铜佛殿), etc.

=== Yuantong Wonderful Realm ===
This old temple is noted for its unusual structure which is high at the front and low at the back, From the front archway named "Yuantong Shengjing" (Wonderland), one can behold the entire garden.

=== Yuantong Hall ===
To the north is the splendid Yuantong main hall. At both sides of the hall are covered corridors running beside clear pools. This structure of a Buddhist hall surrounded by water is unique in China. The main hall maintains the style of Chinese architecture of 12th century. Circling the two central pillars inside the hall are two giant dragons carved during the Ming dynasty. The blue and yellow dragons face each other, as if they are ready to fight.

The stone staircases on both sides of the main hall are carved out of the cliff and are known as the "Caizhilu." From here one can climb to the top of the mountain. Beside the path are the most ancient inscriptions in Kunming. Weathering in the wind and rain for centuries, the characters are still clear today, and they are one of the most important historical relics in the city.

Behind the main hall are two caves, the "Yougu" and "Chaoying". The caves wind far into the mysterious depths of the mountain, and, according to local legend, were once the home of dragons. In the Nanzhao Kingdom, a monk built a temple beside the cliff to entice the dragons. When the temple was destroyed, he built a terrace on which to perform magic on the dragons. Sun Ranweng, author and writer of the long antithetical couplet hung on the Daguan Belvedere, used to make a living by predicting people's fortunes here.
