= Wang Da-hong =

Chinese-born Taiwanese architect

Wang Da-hong 王大閎
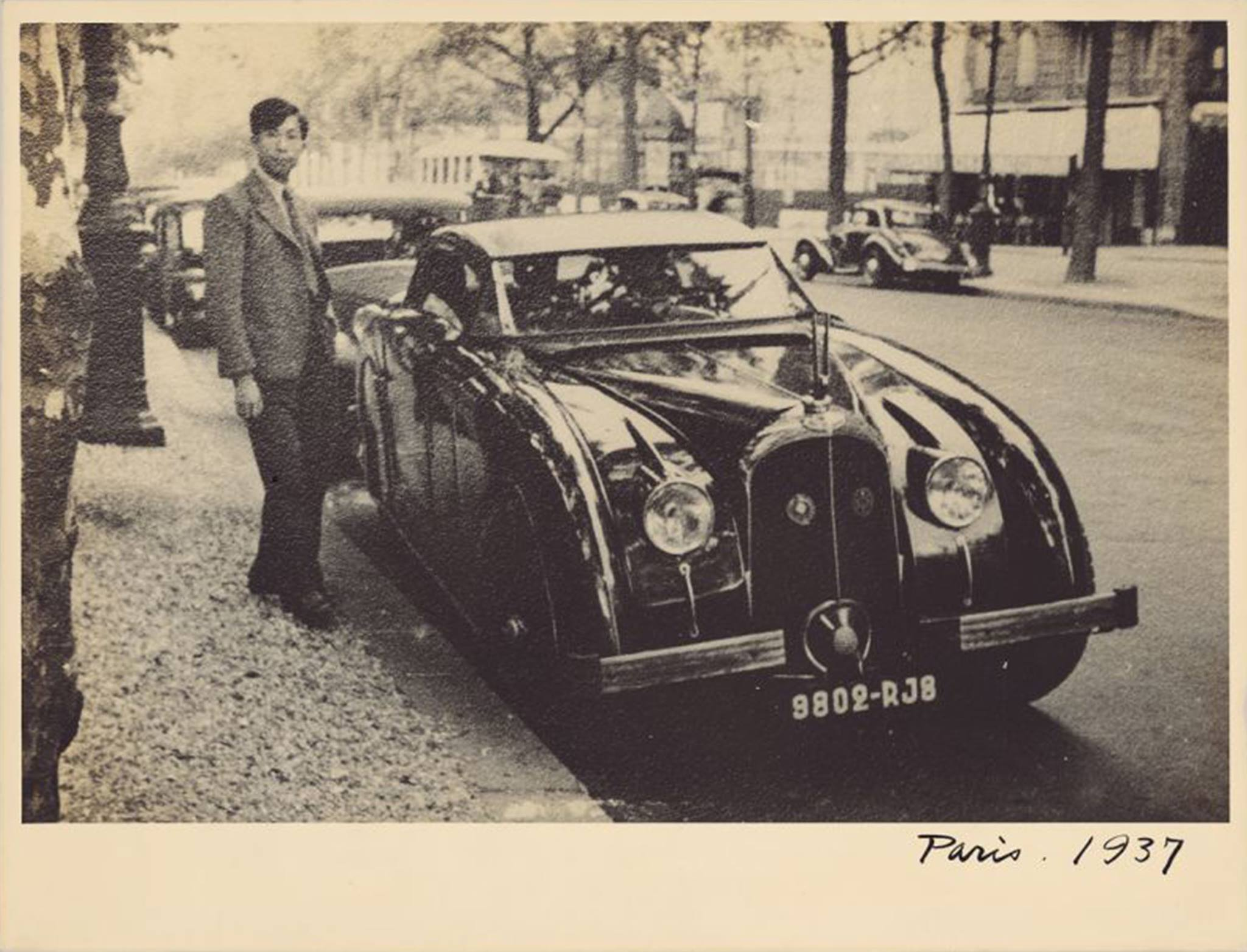
- Wang Da-hong in 1937
- Born: 6 July 1917; Beijing, Republic of China
- Died: 28 May 2018 (aged 100)
- Education: University of Cambridge (BA); Harvard University (MArch)
- Occupation: Architect
- Parent: Wang Chonghui (father)
- Buildings: Sun Yat-sen Memorial Hall; Ministry of Foreign Affairs

Wang Da-hong (Chinese: 王大閎; 6 July 1917 – 28 May 2018) was a Chinese-born Taiwanese architect. Regarded as one of the pioneers of modernist architecture in Taiwan, his architectural philosophy, whilst very modern in its application, was informed by both the traditional Chinese garden and the Siheyuan – a historical type of family residence which comprises several dwellings around a courtyard.

== Biography ==
Wang was born in Beijing, but grew up in Shanghai and Suzhou. His father was Wang Ch'ung-hui, a prominent Chinese jurist, diplomat and politician. During the early 1930s, he went to school in Switzerland. In 1936, he started studying engineering at Cambridge University before switching to architecture. In 1940, he enrolled at Harvard University, where he was taught by Walter Gropius. There, Wang was briefly a classmate of Huang Zuo-shen (aka Henry Huang), who would later become known as the founding director of The School of Architecture at Tongji University. Wang was also a classmate of both IM Pei and Philip Johnson.

Returning to Shanghai in 1947, he met up again with Huang Zuo-shen, and they both started working as part of the Five United, a disparate group of Chinese architects who had mostly studied at British universities.

The Society for Research and Preservation of Wang Da-hong's Architecture was founded in December 2013. Shyu Ming-song, secretary general of the society, says that Wang's single-story house (c.1953) on Jianguo South Road in Taipei “...was perhaps the first Western-style work with Chinese features to garner high acclaim in Taiwan”.

Wang was also a fiction writer, with two novels published. In February 2014, he was awarded Taiwan's National Cultural Award.

His notable works include the Sun Yat-sen Memorial Hall and the Ministry of Foreign Affairs building in Taipei. In the early 1960s, Wang won the competition to design the National Palace Museum, however his modernist design was ultimately rejected in favour of a more traditional approach by Huang Baoyu.

Wang died on 28 May 2018 at the age of 100.

== Selected works ==
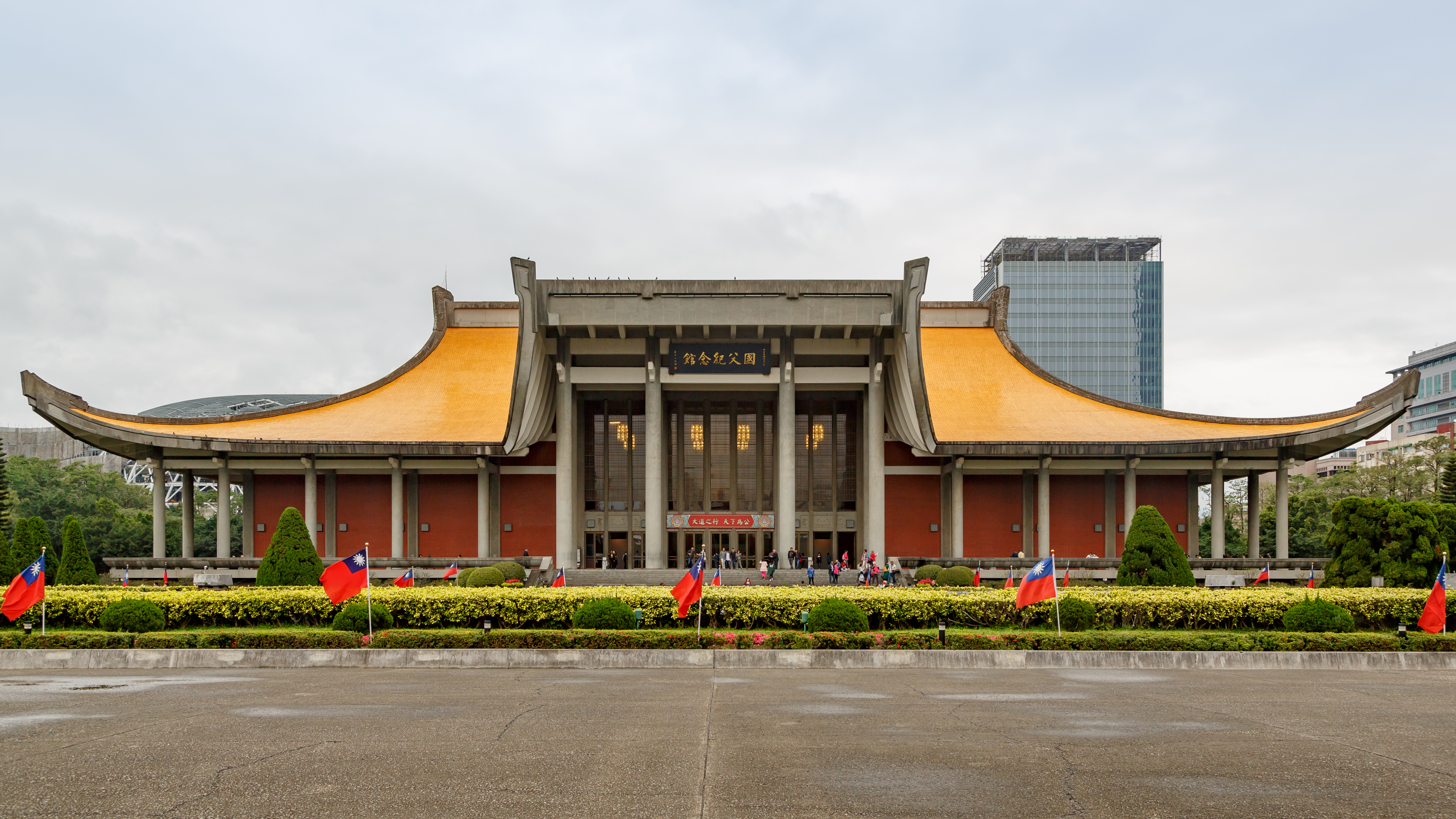
Sun Yat-sen Memorial Hall by architect Wang Da-hong

- Wei Family residence in Taiwan (late 1940s)
- Office of Taiwan Fisheries (late 1940s)
- Central Bank, Guangzhou branch (late 1940s)
- Yangde Avenue Japanese Ambassador to China (c.1953)
- Architect's residence, Jianguo South Road, Taipei (c.1953) – demolished, later rebuilt as a replica in the Taipei Art Park (c.2014)
- National Taiwan University Fisheries Museum (c.1954)
- National Taiwan University Department of Chemistry (c.1957)
- National Taiwan University Museum (c.1959)
- Initial blueprint for the National Palace Museum (early c.1960s) – later rejected
- Ma Gongzhong Oil Office Building (c.1960)
- National Taiwan University First Student Activity Center (c.1961)
- Taipei Prison ( Kameyama Prison ) General Office, Factory, Auditorium (c.1961)
- National Taiwan University Chemical Engineering Museum (c.1961, c.1971 expansion east and west sides)
- National Taiwan University Geological Science Museum (c.1962)
- Freshwater Golf Club (c.1963)
- National Taiwan University Law School Library (c.1963)
- Lin Yutang house (c.1963)
- Hong-Lu Apartments, Jinan Road, Taipei (c.1964)
- Asian Cement Building (c.1966)
- National Taiwan University girls ninth dormitory (c.1966)
- Monument to the Moon Conquest (c.1969) – not constructed
- National Taiwan University Returnees Scholars (c.1970, Changxing Street, No. 60, No. 62)
- Good House (c.1970)
- Office of the Ministry of Education of the Republic of China (c.1971)
- Songshan Airport expansion (c.1971, co-design)
- Sun Yat-sen Memorial Hall, Taipei (16 May c.1972)
- National Taiwan University Comprehensive Classroom and Comprehensive Auditorium (c.1972)
- Honglin Building (c.1972)
- Republic of China (ROC) Ministry of Foreign Affairs building, Taipei (c.1972)
- Institute of Biochemistry, Central Research Institute (completed in the first phase 1974, completed in Phase II, 1977, at the University of Taiwan )
- Institute of Botany, Academia Sinica Li Xianwen Memorial Hall (c.1975)
- Central Research Institute Three People's Institute Building (c.1976)
- National Taiwan University Agricultural Museum (c.1976)
- Zhang Qunying (in c.1977, now Zhang Qun's former residence
- Central Institute of Mathematics Institute Building (c.1977)
- Qingling Industrial Research Center Building (c.1977, located in Taiwan University )
- Tianyu Apartment (c.1979)
- Renaissance East Gate Christian Church Presbyterian Church (c.1980)
- Institute of Information Science, Central Research Institute (c.1980)
- Dongwu University City campus cast autumn building (c.1981)
- Central Research Institute European and American Joint Building (c.1982)
- Central Research Institute of Historical Relics (c.1984)
- Institute of Molecular Biology, Central Research Institute (c.1985)
- Central Research Institute Student Hostel (c.1987)
- National Taiwan University Health Care and Medical Center (c.1987)
- Soochow University Sungai Campus School (c.1989)
- Chen Xiayu House (c.1995)

== Publications ==
- Du Lian-kue (1977, novel) by Wang Da-hong – published in Chinese
- Phantasmagoria (2013, novel) by Wang Da-hong – published in English, later translated into Chinese
