= Luke Him Sau =

Chinese architect

- Born: July 29, 1904; Wongneichung Village, Happy Valley, Hong Kong
- Died: January 23, 1991 (aged 86); Hong Kong
- Other names: Luk Tsang Shau (陸增壽)
- Occupation: Architect
- Known for: Member of Five United

Chinese name
- Chinese: 陸謙受
Transcriptions
Standard Mandarin
- Hanyu Pinyin: Lù Qiānshòu

Luke Him Sau (Chinese: 陸謙受; pinyin: Lù Qiānshòu; 29 July 1904 - 23 January 1991; also known as Luk Tsang Shau, 陸增壽) was a Chinese architect who practiced in the early and mid twentieth century. During the late 1920s, Luke was one of the first Chinese students to be trained at the Architectural Association School of Architecture (AA) in London, and studied under Eric Rawlsham Jarrett, Charles Stanley White, Stephen Rowland Pierce and Eric Leslie Bird.

Luke is regarded as a key member of the first generation of Chinese architects, and worked on projects in Hong Kong, Shanghai, Guangzhou, Macau and Taiwan. In the early 1940s, he was a member of the Five United, an architectural practice formed by a disparate group of Chinese architects who had mostly studied at British universities.

Between 1945 and 1948, he was head of the urban planning committee for Greater Shanghai. He returned to Hong Kong in 1949, before the communist takeover in mainland China. There, his practice was called HS Luke & Associates, and later renamed in 1950 as PAPRO – Progressive Architecture, Planning & Research Organisation. He was a foundation member of the Hong Kong Society of Architects in 1956.

== Selected works ==
- Bank of China, Yates Road, Shanghai (c. 1934)
- Bank of China, Nanjing branch (c. late 1930s)
- Bank of China, Qingdao branch (c. late 1930s)
- Bank of China, Suzhou branch (c. late 1930s)
- Villa for T. V. Soong, Red Cliff Village, Chongqing (c.1943)
- Sea Charm Residence, Repulse Bay, Hong Kong(c. 1950 – 1962)
- So Uk housing estate, Kowloon, Hong Kong (c. 1952 – 1962)
- South Sea Textile Limited Company Office, Tsuen Wan, Hong Kong (c. 1955 – 1967)
- Tonnochy Road Commercial Building, Wanchai, Hong Kong (c.1963)
- Repulse Bay Towers (c. early 1960s)
