= List of Chinese architects =

This list of Chinese architects includes notable architects and architecture firms with a strong connection to China (i.e., born in China, located in China or known primarily for their work in China). For a more complete list, see Category:Chinese architects and Category:Architecture firms of China.

== Individuals ==
=== A ===
- Ai Weiwei

=== B ===
- Carlos Henrique Basto
- Herbert William Bird
- Lennox Godfrey Bird

=== C ===
- Cai Xiang
- Yung Ho Chang
- Chau Cham-son
- Chen Chan-siang
- Chen Chi-kwan
- Cheng Taining
- John Caer Clark

=== D ===
- Dai Fudong
- Dong Mei

=== F ===
- Robert Fan
- Fu Xinqi

=== H ===
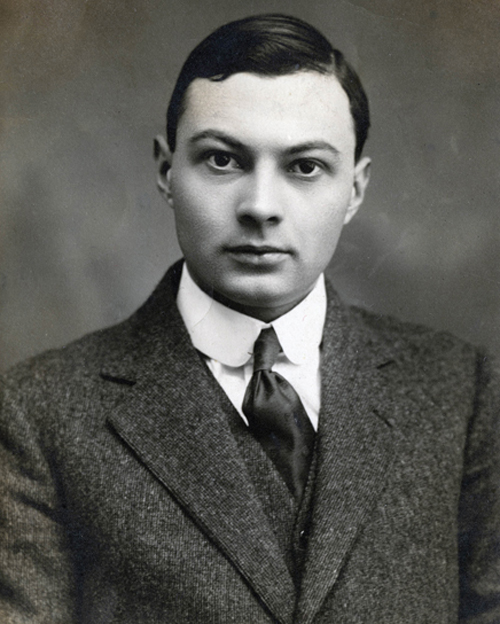
László Hudec

- Lin Hao
- He Jingtang
- Edward Ho
- Tao Ho
- A. Shelton Hooper
- Huang Baoyu
- Huang Hui
- Huang Zuo-shen
- László Hudec

=== J ===
- Ji Cheng

=== K ===
- Raymond Kan
- Kuai Xiang
- Michael Kwan

=== L ===
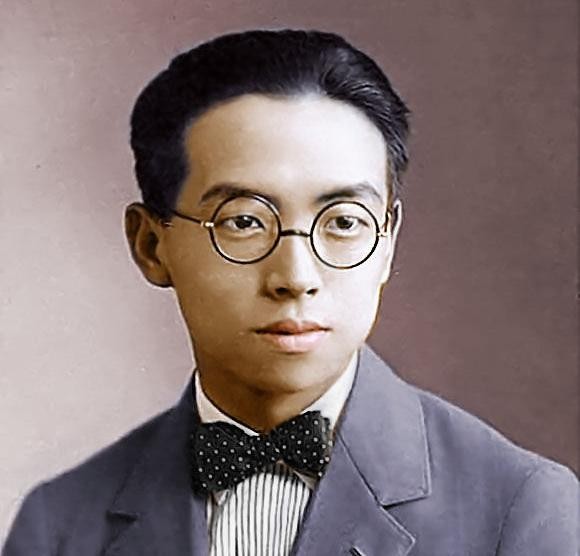
Liang Sicheng

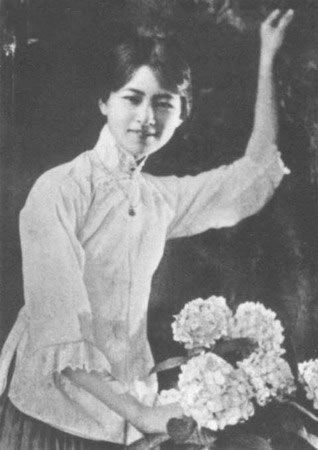
Lin Huiyin

- Patrick Lau
- C. Y. Lee
- Chen Kuen Lee
- Poy Gum Lee
- Roger Lee
- Robert K. Leigh
- Li Jie
- Naihan Li
- Li Xiang (architect)
- Li Xinggang
- Liang Sicheng
- Donald Liao
- Lin Huiyin
- Liu Jipiao
- Liu Yichun
- Jing Liu
- Sun-chang Lo
- Lu Wenyu

=== M ===
- Qingyun Ma

=== N ===
- Nazaruddin
- Nguyễn An

=== P ===
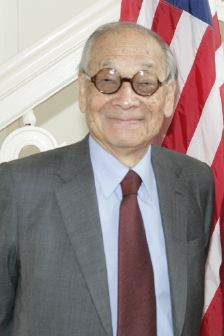
I.M. Pei, Pritzker Prize winner (1983)

- Pau Shiu-hung
- I.M. Pei
- Thomas Luff Perkins

=== Q ===
- Qi Kang

=== R ===
- Rong Baisheng

=== S ===
- Luke Him Sau
- Tszwai So
- Su Song
- Szeto Wai

=== T ===
- Liem Bwan Tjie

=== W ===
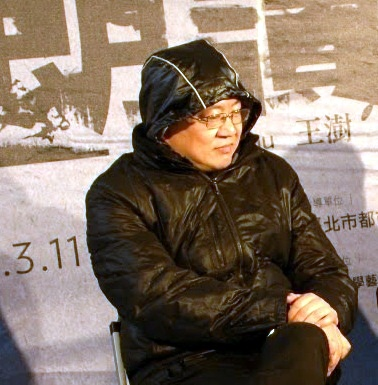
Wang Shu, Pritzker Prize winner (2012)

- Wang Da-hong
- Wang Shu
- Kacey Wong
- Y. C. Wong
- Michael Wright
- Wu Liangyong
- Wu Lusheng

=== X ===
- Xiu Zelan

=== Y ===
- Yan Liben
- Yang Cho-cheng
- Yang Tingbao
- Yao Shu
- Yu Hao

=== Z ===
- Zhang Ke

== Firms ==
- Aedas
- China Construction Design International
- EDGE Design Institute
- Farrells
- Integrated Design Associates
- Keys and Dowdeswell
- Leigh & Orange
- MAD Studio
- P&T Architects and Engineers
- Rocco Design Architects
- Ronald Lu and Partners
- WAI Architecture Think Tank
- Wong & Ouyang (HK) Ltd.
- Wong Tung & Partners

== See also ==
- Chinese architecture
- List of architects
- List of Chinese artists
