= WAI Architecture Think Tank =

Architectural practice in China formed 2008

Practice information
- Key architects: Cruz García, Nathalie Frankowski
- Founded: 2008
- Location: Beijing

Website
- www.waithinktank.com

WAI Architecture Think Tank or WAI Think Tank is an architectural practice based in Beijing that was founded in Brussels in 2008 by Cruz García and Nathalie Frankowski.

== Background ==
After founding WAI Architecture Think Tank in 2008, Cruz García and Nathalie Frankowski relocated their practice to Beijing in 2009.

== Buildings and Books ==
WAI Architecture Think Tank has been selected as finalist in several museum design competitions, including the shortlisted design for the National Centre for Contemporary Arts, in Moscow, Russia and the Museum of Gardens in Suzhou. Since 2011 WAI Architecture Think Tank publishes an independent architecture and urbanism magazine titled What About It? In 2013 they wrote, designed and published the book Pure Hardcore Icons: A Manifesto on Pure Form in Architecture. In 2014 Pure Hardcore Icons was translated into German and published by the quarterly magazine ARCH+.

Since 2008 WAI Architecture Think Tank founders Cruz García and Nathalie Frankowski have been collaborating on the art collective Garcia Frankowski, creating exhibitions, curatorial projects and publications including the book Shapes, Islands, Texts: A Garcia Frankowski Manifesto.

Several manifestoes (Architecture and Art manifesto) and essays of WAI Architecture Think Tank have been translated into Spanish, Chinese, German, Arabic and Portuguese. The work of WAI Think Tank has been exhibited at the Museum of Modern Art (MoMA) in New York, the Kunst-Werke Institute for Contemporary Art in Berlin, the Centre for Chinese Contemporary Art in Manchester and in St. Petersburg, Moscow, New York, Los Angeles, Columbus, Chicago, Michigan, Barcelona, Madrid, Bratislava, Buenos Aires, Zurich, Basel, San Juan, Montevideo, Guadalajara, London, Manchester Beijing, Shanghai, Tokyo, Osaka, Milan, Venice, Istanbul, Prague, Helsinki, Paris, Zurich, Sydney, Melbourne, Lisbon and Porto.

WAI Architecture Think Tank is one of the participants of the inaugural Chicago Architecture Biennial.

== Publications ==
- Cruz García & Nathalie Frankowski, “Pure Hardcore Icons: A Manifesto on Pure Form in Architecture”, (Artifice Books on Architecture: London, 2013). ISBN 978-1-908967-39-8
- Cruz García & Nathalie Frankowski, “Shapes, Islands, Texts: A Garcia Frankowski Manifesto”, (Vibok Works: Sevilla, 2014) ISBN 978-84-941464-7-3

== Exhibitions ==
- 2015 Room of Manifestoes, Arch+ Displays, Kunst-Werke Institute for Contemporary Art, Berlin
- 2014 Archizines Beijing, Quanyechang Bazaar, Beijing
- 2014 Paper Manifestoes, Quanyechang Bazaar, Beijing
- 2014 Archizines Shanghai, HKU Study Centre, Shanghai
- 2014 The Voice Currency: Making Community, Centre for Chinese Contemporary Art (CFCCA), Manchester, UK.
- 2014 The Vestige of Architecture, Mingtai Space, Beijing
- 2013 Pure Hardcore Icons: Manifesto Exhibition, The Factory, Dashilar District, Beijing
- 2013 Cut 'n' Paste: From Architectural Assemblage to Collage City, Museum of Modern Art, New York
- 2013 Walls, Islands, Frames, Mirrors, CU Space, Beijing
- 2013 Archizines, Vitra Design Museum, Weil am Rhein
- 2012 Archizines + Arch-Art! Books, Storefront for Art and Architecture, New York
- 2012 What About It?, University of Puerto Rico, San Juan
- 2011 What About it?, Tsinghua University, Beijing
- 2011 What About it?, CU Space, Beijing
- 2011 Archizines, Architectural Association, London
- 2010 Post Post Post Nueva Arquitectura Iberoamericana, CCEBA, Buenos Aires
- 2010 Unplanned: Research and Experiments at the Urban Scale, Superfront Gallery, Los Angeles
