= Qi Shanshan =

Chinese architect

- Born: Hangzhou, China
- Education: Columbia University, Harvard University
- Awards: Unsung Hero - Female Frontier Award Green Women Power 100 2020 AIA American Institute of Architects Award European LEAF (Leading European Architecture Forum) Award A&D Trophy Awards for Architecture & Design in Asia-Pacific World Architecture Festival (WAF) Architect of the Year Award WA Awards for Best Residential Architecture

Qi Shanshan is a Chinese architect, and teaches at Zhejiang University in Hangzhou, China.

Educated at the Barnard College of Columbia University and Harvard University, Qi has been serving as a thesis advisor at the China Academy of Art since 2014.

== Early life and education ==
Qi Shanshan grew up in Hangzhou, China and went abroad at the age of fourteen to further her education. Qi graduated with distinction from Barnard College of Columbia University (The Women's College of Columbia University), Summa Cum Laude and Centennial Scholar. She received a Master of Architecture degree from Harvard University. Qi recently completed a doctoral degree researching on the topic, “Existence and 2.5 Dimensional Perceptions of Architecture” with Pritzker Prize Laureate, Wang Shu.

== Career ==
Qi Shanshan founded Studio Qi, a sole-female led firm located in Hangzhou in 2013. Over 90% of the employees are female architects and designers. Qi is a leading figure in pushing for the awareness of gender inequality, preservation of the richness of the rural and the cultural in China and challenging the new definition of archi-tourism.

Qi has worked for Renzo Piano Office and Foster + Partners.

== Recognition ==
Qi won the prestigious Unsung Hero - Female Frontier Award and was named the Green Women Power 100.

Studio Qi has won many international architectural awards, including the AIA American Institute of Architects Architecture Award, the European LEAF Green Leaf Architecture Gold Award, the A&D Asia Pacific Architectural Design Gold Award, the American WAF Master Architect Award, the WA China Architecture Award Best Living Award and the Technology Progress Award.

In 2016, Nine House designed by Qi Studio won an Urban Environment Design Magazine accolade as China's Most charming boutique villa.

Her work is featured in the book “New Chinese Architecture: Twenty Women Building the Future”.
