= Liu Xianjue =

Chinese architectural historian and educator (1931–2019)

Liu Xianjue (Chinese: 刘先觉; 12 December 1931 – 16 May 2019) was a Chinese architectural historian and educator. He studied under all "Four Modern Masters in Architecture" of China and taught at Southeast University for more than 50 years. He advocated for the protection of architectural heritage in Nanjing and advised the government of Macau in its successful application for World Heritage status for the Historic Centre of Macau.

== Early life and education ==
Liu was born on 12 December 1931 in Fuzhou, Fujian, Republic of China, with his ancestral home in Hefei. During the Second Sino-Japanese War, his family took refuge in Ningdu, Jiangxi, where he attended middle school and learned to speak English from Christian missionaries.

Liu entered the Department of Architecture of Hangchow University in 1949, before transferring to Nanjing University the following year. In 1952, the architecture program of Nanjing University became part of Nanjing Institute of Technology (now Southeast University), where he studied under Yang Tingbao and graduated in 1953.

In 1953, Liu began his graduate studies at Tsinghua University, where he was supervised by Liang Sicheng. His thesis, Chinese Architecture of the Recent 100 Years, was one of the earliest works on the history of modern Chinese architecture. Besides Yang Tingbao and Liang Sicheng, he was also taught by the other two of China's "Four Modern Masters in Architecture": Liu Dunzhen and Tung Chuin.

== Career ==
After graduating in 1956, Liu spent half a century teaching and researching at the Southeast University School of Architecture. In 1981, he was a visiting scholar at Yale University in the United States. He published 30 books and more than 100 papers. He advised 26 doctoral students, 50 master's students, and three postdoctoral researchers. He was conferred the special education prize by the Chinese Architectural Society and awarded a special pension by the National Government of China.

Liu was a strong advocate for the protection of the Republican era architecture of Nanjing. In 1988, he surveyed Nanjing's architecture and chose about 200 valuable buildings for conservation. However, more than 40 of the buildings were demolished during the urban renewal of the city by 2002. Liu lobbied the media and the government for protection of Nanjing's architectural heritage, and the municipal government eventually designated the remaining buildings as protected architecture.

Starting in 2000, Liu advised the government of Macau in its application for World Heritage status for the Historic Centre of Macau. After more than three years of research, he published The Architectural Heritage in Macau in January 2005. The book was submitted as academic evidence for the application, and the Historic Centre of Macau was inscribed on the UNESCO World Heritage List in 2005.

Liu died in Nanjing on 16 May 2019, at the age of 87.
