= Cruz García =

Puerto Rican architect, artist (born 1983)

Cruz Garcia
- Born: 27 June 1983 (age 43); San Juan, Puerto Rico
- Education: University of Puerto Rico
- Occupation: Architect
- Practice: WAI Architecture Think Tank
- Projects: Pure Hardcore Icons: A Manifesto on Pure Form in Architecture

Cruz Garcia (born 1983, San Juan, Puerto Rico) is a Puerto Rican architect, artist, and architectural theorist. Since 2008 he directs WAI Architecture Think Tank, an architectural practice he founded in Brussels with Nathalie Frankowski, with whom he also collaborates in the art collective Garcia Frankowski. Cruz Garcia relocated to Beijing in 2009 with WAI Architecture Think Tank and Garcia Frankowski.

== Background ==
Cruz Garcia was born on 27 June 1983 in San Juan, Puerto Rico to Cruz "Pensa" Garcia (born 1958) and Lourdes Santiago (born 1959). His father is an international athletic coach and physical trainer. Cruz "Pensa" Garcia trained several Olympic athletes and world boxing champions. Boxers trained by Cruz "Pensa" Garcia include Puerto Rican International Boxing Hall of Fame inductee Félix Trinidad, retired former champion Alex Sanchez, and Argentinean former world champion Marcos Maidana.

Part of a family of athletes and coaches, Cruz and his brother Manuel Garcia (an international runner and CAC Junior Champion), were track and field athletes and trained alongside world class athletes and boxing champions.

A crucial point in Cruz Garcia's studies happened in 2008, during Félix Trinidad's last fight as a professional boxer. In his fight versus former world champion Roy Jones Jr., Trinidad brought Garcia as part of his training team to New York in order for him to complete his research on Narrative Architectures with pieces exposed in the Museum of Modern Art in New York.

== Career ==
After receiving a master's degree in Architecture from the University of Puerto Rico, Cruz Garcia moved from Puerto Rico to Brussels, Belgium, where he founded WAI Architecture Think Tank with Nathalie Frankowski. Also during 2008, Cruz Garcia and Nathalie Frankowski started collaborating on the art collective Garcia Frankowski.

Since 2009 both WAI and Garcia Frankowski operate mainly from Beijing making international publications, exhibitions, writings, and architectural projects from the Chinese capital.

Cruz Garcia is the co-editor-in-chief of What About It? an independent architecture and urbanism magazine.

In 2013 Cruz Garcia and Nathalie Frankowski designed and published the book Pure Hardcore Icons: A Manifesto on Pure Form in Architecture.

Cruz Garcia recent projects include the shortlisted design for the National Centre for Contemporary Arts, in Moscow, Russia, and the book Shapes, Islands, Texts: A Garcia Frankowski Manifesto.

The Work of Cruz Garcia has been exhibited in New York, Los Angeles, Columbus, Chicago, Michigan, Barcelona, Madrid, Bratislava, Buenos Aires, San Juan, Montevideo, Guadalajara, London, Beijing, Shanghai, Tokyo, Osaka, Milan, Venice, Istanbul, Prague, Helsinki, Paris, Sydney, Melbourne, Lisbon and Porto.

== Publications ==
- Cruz Garcia & Nathalie Frankowski, "Pure Hardcore Icons: A Manifesto on Pure Form in Architecture”, (Artifice Books on Architecture: London, 2013). ISBN 978-1-908967-39-8
- Cruz Garcia & Nathalie Frankowski, “Shapes, Islands, Texts: A Garcia Frankowski Manifesto”, (Vibok Works: Sevilla, 2013) ISBN 978-84-941464-7-3

Cruz Garcia & Nathalie Frankowski, Pure Hardcore Icons: A Manifesto on Pure Form in Architecture (Artifice Books on Architecture: London, 2013

== Exhibitions ==
- 2014 2014 The Seventh Abstract Art Exhibition, Pifo New Art Gallery, Beijing
- 2014 Experiments on Form, Intelligentsia Gallery, Beijing
- 2014 The Vestige of Architecture, Mingtai Space, Beijing
- 2013 Pure Hardcore Icons: Manifesto Exhibition, The Factory, Dashilar District, Beijing
- 2013 Cut 'n' Paste: From Architectural Assemblage to Collage City, Museum of Modern Art, New York
- 2013 Walls, Islands, Frames, Mirrors, CU Space, Beijing
- 2013 Archizines, Vitra Design Museum, Weil am Rhein
- 2012 Archizines + Arch-Art! Books, Storefront for Art and Architecture, New York
- 2012 What About It?, University of Puerto Rico, San Juan
- 2011 What About it?, Tsinghua University, Beijing
- 2011 What About it?, CU Space, Beijing
- 2011 Archizines, Architectural Association, London
- 2010 Post Post Post Nueva Arquitectura Iberoamericana, CCEBA, Buenos Aires
- 2010 Unplanned: Research and Experiments at the Urban Scale, Superfront Gallery, Los Angeles

== See also ==
- Architecture of Puerto Rico
