= Wu Lusheng =

Chinese architect and academic (1930–2025)

Wu Lusheng

Wu Lusheng (Chinese: 吴庐生; 1 August 1930 – 8 January 2025) was a Chinese architect and a professor of Tongji University. In 2004, she was named by the Ministry of Construction of China as a "National Master of Engineering and Design". Over a career spanning more than 50 years, she collaborated with her husband Dai Fudong on about 100 projects. Wu died on 8 January 2025, at the age of 94.

== Early life ==
Wu was born on 1 August 1930 in Lujiang County, Anhui, Republic of China. The prominent physicist Yan Jici was her godfather. After graduating from the High School of National Central University in 1948, she was admitted to the university's architecture school (now Southeast University School of Architecture), earning her bachelor's degree in 1952.

== Career ==
In 1952, Wu became a faculty member at the Department of Architecture of Tongji University in Shanghai. Dai Fudong, her classmate at National Central University, was also assigned to Tongji, and they married the following year.

In 1958, Wu, Dai, and their colleague Fu Xinqi were appointed co-designers of the Meiling (梅岭) Guesthouse at the East Lake in Wuhan. Half way through the project, they were invited to watch a show with Mao Zedong, and were told that the guesthouse was Mao's personal villa in Wuhan. Mao spent much of his later years at Meiling. Wu and Dai did not see the completed building until 1978, when it was opened to the public as a tourist attraction after Mao's death. After 1972, she worked for the Institute of Architectural Design and Research of Tongji University.

Wu and her husband collaborated on nearly 100 projects. They specialized in small and medium-sized buildings including offices, hotels, and university buildings. They emphasized the use of local materials, strove to utilize limited resources for the maximum benefit, and focused on human comfort and artistic value. In an interview with Chinese media, Wu stated that Dai mainly focused on the overall design, and she on the detailed execution.

In 1988, Wu and Dai designed the architecture school of Tongji University. At the time Chinese universities were poorly financed; they were given a budget of only US$570,000 for the 9,767-square-metre (105,130 sq ft) building. The building was well received, and they were subsequently commissioned to design the university's Run Run Shaw Building and the Graduate School Building.

In 1992–1993, Wu and Dai designed the Big Dipper Mountain Village, a small hotel on the Shandong Peninsula with seven buildings. The buildings had modern interiors, but externally they were covered with local stones and roofs were covered with seaweed, a material used by local farmers for the roofs of their houses, and the pathways were paved with local pebbles with grass planted among them. Their design minimized the cost while giving the hotel a distinct local flavour. They also applied the same design philosophy to the International Hotel in Zunhua.

Wu was awarded 12 national, ministerial, and municipal prizes for her designs. In May 2004, she was named by the Ministry of Construction of China as a "National Master of Engineering and Design".
