= Lin Wenzheng =

Chinese painter

- Born: c. 1902
- Died: 1989 (aged 87); Hangzhou, China
- Occupation: Painter
- Spouse: Cai Weilian
- Children: 6

Lin Wenzheng (Chinese: 林文錚; c. 1902 – 1989), from Meixian, Guangdong Province. He was an outstanding art educator, art critic and translator in China. He was one of the founders and the first dean of the National Academy of Art (now the China Academy of Art), and a major practitioner of Cai Yuanpei's aesthetic eduction thought.

== Personal works ==
Throughout his life, Lin Wenzheng produced a prolific body of work. He authored the art theory collection What is Art. He was responsible for drafting programmatic documents such as the Manifesto of the Art Movement Society and the Teaching Outline of the National Art School. He published over 100 articles or poems, including "Art Movement," "The Significance of the Capital Art Exhibition", "Don't Forget Sculpture and Architecture", and "Suggestions for the West Lake Art Academy". His creative works include stage play scripts such as Xi Shi, Farewell at Yi River, and Fragrant Concubine. His translations include Legends of the Tang and Song Dynasties, A Brief History of Chinese Fiction (by Lu Xun), Les Fleurs du mal, and Twenty Years After, which have become important documents for the study of modern Chinese art history.

== Early life and career ==
Lin spent some seven years studying Western painting in Paris, France; in 1924, he founded the Society of Overseas Artists in Paris together with fellow artists Lin Fengmian, Liu Jipiao, and others. Returning to China, Lin taught art at various schools and was for some time provost at the Hangzhou-based China Academy of Art, where his wife Cai Weilian (1904–1939) also taught. In World War II, Lin and his family moved to Kunming, Yunnan, where he worked with the Southwest United Universities. Lin and his wife had six children; Cai Weilian died two days after giving birth to their sixth child in 1939. Having to juggle multiple jobs to make ends meet, Lin found life as a widower almost unbearable but found solace in poetry and Buddhism.

== Later years and death ==
Following the Chinese Civil War, Lin relocated to Nanjing and lectured on foreign literature at the Nanjing University. In 1954, he married Lian Dizhen (连棣贞), a proofreader at the Nanjing University Press who was about twenty years his junior. Lin Wenzheng was sentenced to twenty years of imprisonment in November 1957 for allegedly propagating right-wing sentiments, leaving his second wife Lian in charge of the household. During the Cultural Revolution, Lian was identified by the government as a potential counter-revolutionary, tortured, and ultimately coerced into divorcing Lin; she died two years later. In 1975, while still in prison, Lin was commissioned to translate A Brief History of Chinese Fiction by Lu Xun from Chinese to French. Lin was released a year later; he spent his final years in Hangzhou, under his youngest daughter Zhengming's care, and died in 1989 aged 87.
