= Southeast University School of Architecture =

Professional school in China

SEU School of Architecture
- Type: Public
- Established: 1927
- Location: Nanjing, Jiangsu, China
- Campus: Urban
- Website: School website

The Southeast University School of Architecture (SEU Arch, Chinese: 东南大学建筑学院; pinyin: Dōngnán Dàxué Jiànzhù Xuéyuàn) is one of the professional schools of Southeast University in Nanjing, China. Founded in 1927, SEU School of Architecture is the oldest school of architecture in China and one of the most prestigious. It is ranked among the top three of Chinese architecture schools according to CDGDC, Ministry of Education of China.

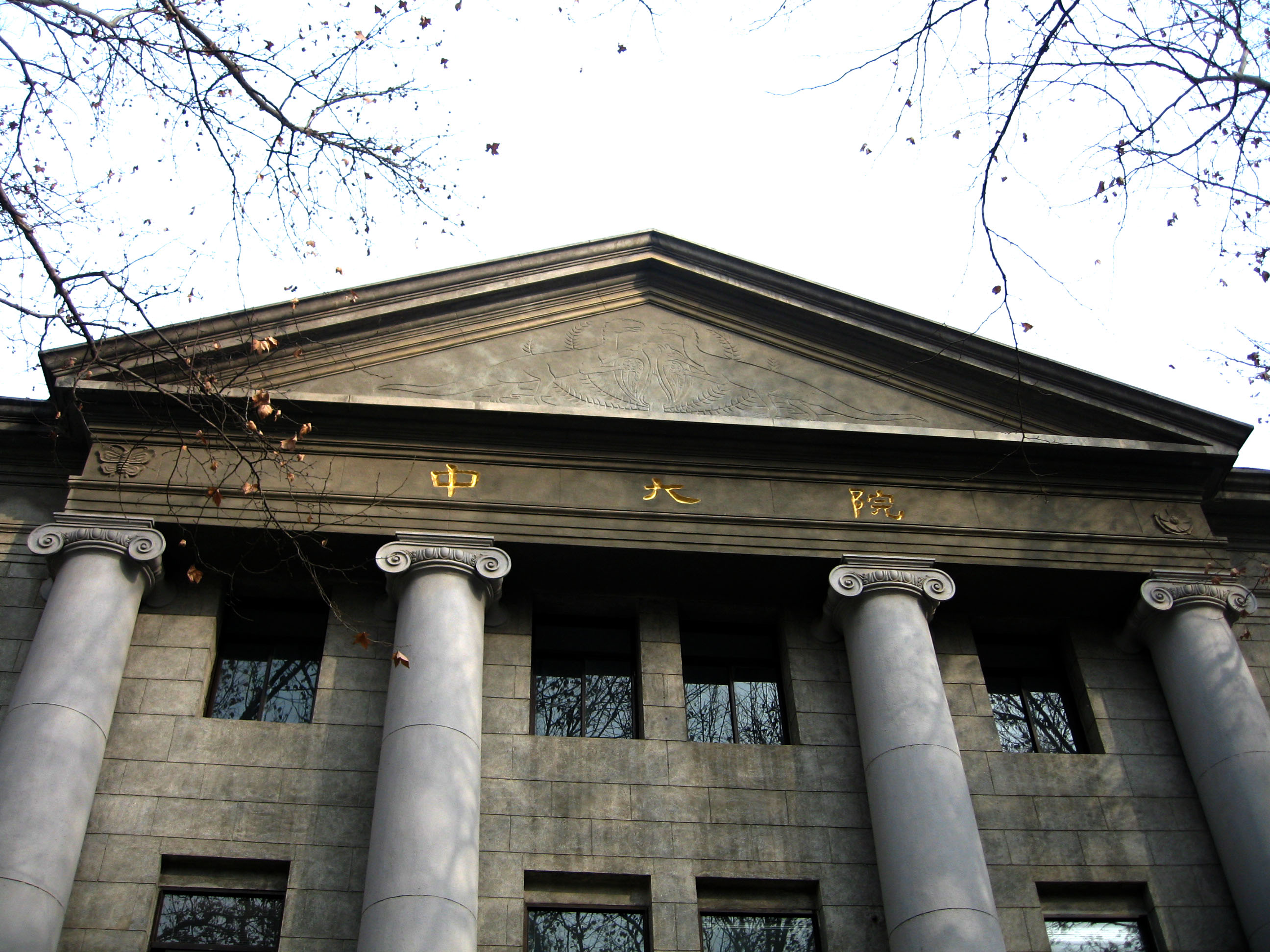
Zhongda Hall, the building of SEU School of Architecture

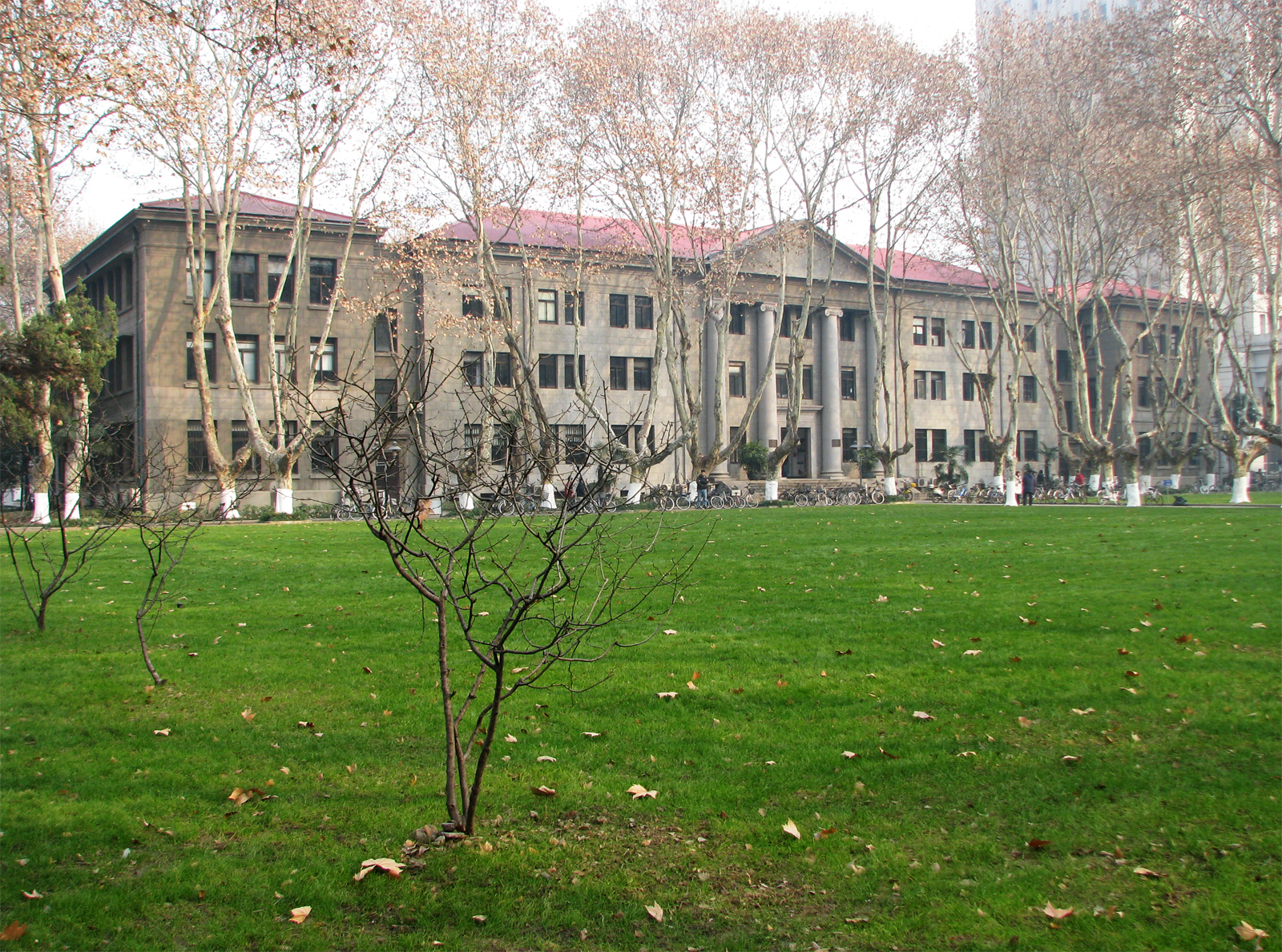
Zhongda Hall, the building of SEU School of Architecture

== History ==
The school was renamed several times because of the name change of the university.

- Department of Architecture, National Central University (1927–1949)
- Department of Architecture, National Nanjing University (1949–1952)
- Department of Architecture, Nanjing Institute of Technology (1952–1988)
- Southeast University School of Architecture (1988 – Present)

== Alumni ==
- Wang Shu, Pritzker Architecture Prize winner of 2012
- Yung Ho Chang, former chair of the Department of Architecture, Massachusetts Institute of Technology, U.S.
- Y. C. Wong
- Qi Kang
- Xiu Zelan
- Yang Tingbao
- Tong Jun
- Liu Dunzhen
- Chen Chi-Kwan, former dean of the College of Engineering, Tunghai University, Taiwan
- Wu Liangyong, co-founder and former dean of the School of Architecture, Tsinghua University, China
- Cheng Taining
- Zhong Xunzheng
- Dai Fudong, former dean of the College of Architecture and Urban Planning, Tongji University, China
- Zhang Kaiji
- Zhang Bo, designer of the Great Hall of the People
- Liu Xianjue, architectural historian
