= Fu Xinqi =

Chinese architect and professor (1919–2019)

- 傅信祁
- Born: 1919; Zhenhai, Zhejiang, Republic of China
- Died: April 26, 2019 (aged 99–100); Shanghai, China
- Other name: Xuefan (雪帆)
- Education: Tongji University
- Occupations: Architect, professor
- Political party: Chinese Communist Party

Chinese name
- Chinese: 傅信祁
Transcriptions
Standard Mandarin
- Hanyu Pinyin: Fù xìnqí

Fu Xinqi (Chinese: 傅信祁; 1919 – 26 April 2019) was a Chinese architect and professor at Tongji University. He was a co-designer of Mao Zedong's villa in Wuhan and served as a director member of the National Architecture and Engineering Commission. After retiring as an architect and professor, he took up painting and became accomplished in guóhuà.

== Early life and education ==
Fu was born in 1919 in Zhenhai, Zhejiang, Republic of China. He grew up and went to school in Qingdao and Jinan in Shandong province. His father, Fu Zhongbo (傅忠博; 1890–1942), was a businessman and art collector.

In 1937, Fu entered the technical training school of Tongji University in Shanghai, studying civil engineering. After the Second Sino-Japanese War broke out in 1937 and Shanghai fell during the Battle of Shanghai, Tongji evacuated the city and moved inland. As the Japanese Army advanced, the university was forced to relocate five times across half of China, to Jinhua, Ganzhou, Babu, Kunming, and eventually Lizhuang in Sichuan. Fu moved with the university and graduated from its technical training school in 1940.

After working a few years in Kunming as a technician, Fu learned that Tongji began admitting new students in Lizhuang. He tested into the civil engineering department of the university in 1943. After the surrender of Japan in 1945, Tongji moved back to Shanghai in 1946.

== Career ==
Upon his graduation in July 1947, Fu was hired by Tongji University as an assistant professor while also starting Chunshen Engineering Firm (春申工程事务所) with his classmates. He studied in Moscow in 1959. He taught at the university until his retirement in 1986, eventually rising to full professor.

In 1958, Fu and his colleagues Dai Fudong and Wu Lusheng were appointed co-designers of the Meiling (梅岭) Guesthouse at the East Lake in Wuhan. Half way through the project, they were invited to watch a show with Mao Zedong, and were told that the guesthouse was Mao's personal villa in Wuhan. Mao spent much of his later years at Meiling.

In 1981, Fu was appointed a director member of the National Architecture and Engineering Commission. He became a member emeritus after 1987. In 1983, he taught at Sanaa Engineering School, a Chinese foreign aid project in the Yemen Arab Republic.

After retiring from his academic career in 1986, he started Shidai Architectural Design Company (时代建筑设计公司) with other professors and served as its chief architect. He was certified a Grade 1 architect by the national government.

In 2003, Fu retired from his architectural firm and began to study guohua, which had always interested him owing to his father's influence. In 1955, he had donated his father's extensive art collection to Shandong Museum, including works by such famous artists as Zheng Xie. In July 2018, Liu Haisu Art Museum held Fu's personal exhibition to celebrate his 100th birthday (in East Asian age reckoning). His art works were published by Shanghai People's Art Publishing House that same year.

Fu died on 26 April 2019 at Xinhua Hospital in Shanghai, at the age of 100.
