= Liu Yichun =

Chinese architect

- Born: November , 1969; Haiyang, Shandong, China
- Occupation: Architect
- Awards: Year's Design Vanguard of 2011, by Architectural Record (USA)
- Practice: Atelier Deshaus
- Buildings: Long Museum (West Bund), 2014; Spiral Art Gallery I, 2011

Liu Yichun (柳亦春, born in November 1969) is a Chinese architect, based in Shanghai, China. After served as Chief Architect of the Architectural Design Institute of Tongji University from 1997 to 2000, he founded his own architecture office Atelier Deshaus with Chen Yifeng and Zhuang Shen in 2001. Trying to keep Chinese traditions alive, Liu borrows the principles and philosophy from ancient Chinese architecture and links them with the present in the attempt to create new meanings of architecture.

== Early life ==
Liu was born in 1969 in Haiyang, Shandong Province, China. After graduating from Tongji University, Shanghai, attracted by the rapid urban development in Guangzhou, he worked as an architect for Architectural Design Institute, Guangzhou. Encouraged by his mentor in the design institute, he later decided to continue his architectural education and accomplished his master's degree in Architecture in Tongji University in 1997. At that time, led by the Shanghai new development set up by the Central Government, more opportunities were opened for young architects, which made Liu decide to stay in Shanghai. Serving as the Chief Architect of the Architectural Design Institute of Tongji University from 1997 to 2000, he realized he gradually neglected his creativity and independent thinking on too many commercial projects, which finally led him to found his own office, the Atelier Deshaus, in 2001.

== Style ==
Liu was raised in a village near Nanjing, Jiangsu in Southern China where the culture of "Jiangnan" prevails and strongly influenced his architecture. Jiangnan literally means the south of Yangtze River and, in architecture, is famous for its unique typology—Chinese garden. Stick with the traditional "Jiangnan" culture, he believes that the wisdom in classical architecture would be able to help him find a way to really reconstruct memory of people's life. Instead of just copying the forms like ancient pagodas and roofs, he focused more on the spatial relationship that works for actual functions and users. By appreciating how ancient architects manipulated the relationships between different kinds of spaces, building and context, building and nature, he developed sophisticated spatial mechanisms, such as "separation" and "continuation", that involves physical experience and evokes memory. His abstract philosophy and altitude are materialized and manifested through the continuously changing experiences. He carefully designs both interior and exterior space to encourage more social interactions and activities.

Emphasized on public projects such as kindergarten, park, temple, art gallery, museum, etc., Liu and his teamwork in a careful way and produce relatively small portfolio. Facing with the contemporary condition in China, where everything is developing so rapidly, he would like to create "a slower, more cautious rhythm" to promote the awareness to observe, to think and to reflect.

== Works ==
Liu is excellent in interconnecting context with the building and creating continuously changing physical experience. In his Spiral Gallery in Jiading New Town, completed in 2011, "pure round is inserted by a spiral, brings into a primal space with a spiral interior flowing from the public to the private; most importantly, it gives a way to enter the building from the landscape: you can enter the annular interior space directly, or walk along the spiral external stairway to first get onto the higher place of the rooftop, and then go downstairs to the central courtyard to enter the building. The plot, angle and height of the view are continuously transformed, the spatial height is changed, and the introverted and open spaces are being mutually altered by the walking direction as well. A cruise joy is provided, which also can be seen as an abstract way of the Chinese garden. Here, the way to view is also the way to enter the building".

In his another work, Kindergarten of Jiading New Town, the architecture presents a spatial experience that is beyond the common daily experiencing. A vertical arrangement of different heights makes the building dynamic and produces an interesting interior for children to play with. "Beside the transportation function, it is e vagueness and uncertainty at also provide a number of possibilities in spatial utilization".

His latest work is Long Museum West Bund in Shanghai, completed in 2014, adopted from a Coal-Hopper-Unloading-Bridge that was constructed in the 1950s. The old structure is remained for underground parking and the new designs are embedded into the original basement so as to be concreted with the existing framework structure. "As to the overground space covered by the "vault-umbrella", the walls and the ceiling feature as-cast-finish concrete surface so that their geometrical dividing line seems faint. Such structure cannot only shield the human body in conformation but visually echoes with the Coal-Hopper-Unloading-Bridge at the wharf. Moreover, the building's internal space can also represent a kind of primordial and tameless charm while the spatial dimension, large or small, and the as-cast-finish concrete surface with the seam among moulding boards and the bolt holes bring a sense of reality as well. The directness and simplicity resulting from this "literal" structure, material and space plus the sense of force or lightness because of large-scale overhanging style enables the overall building's continuation of the industrial property of the original site, not only in time but in space."

== Project list ==
- 2014 Long Museum (West Bund)
- 2012 Youth Center of Qingpu
- 2011 Spiral Art Gallery I
- 2011 Spiral Art Gallery II
- 2010 Kindergarten in Jiading New Town
- 2009 Gas administration building in Jiading New Town
- 2009 Ningguo Buddhist Temple un
- 2007 E Hotel in Xixi Wetland Art Village
- 2008 Tea House in Jishan
- 2008 Plot 6 of Jishan Base in Jiangsu Software Park
- 2006 Maritime Safety Administration Building of Zhujiajiao
- 2005 Office Building of Qingpu Private Enterprise Association
- 2005 Xiayu Kindergarten
- 2004 Electron Department, Dongguan Institute of Technology
- 2004 Liberal Art Department, Dongguan Institute of Technology
- 2004 Computer Department, Dongguan Institute of Technology
- 2003 Tri-house

== Awards ==
- 2012 WA China Architecture Award, Shortlist, for Spiral Gallery
- 2011 Year's Design Vanguard of 2011, by Architectural Record (USA)
- 2010 Second Prize, 2010 CA'ASI Chinese New Architecture
- 2010 Honorable award, 2010 Far Eastern Outstanding Architectural Design Award, Kindergarten in Jiading New Town
- 2010 Honorable Award, 2010 WA China Architecture Awards, Kindergarten in Jiading New Town
- 2010 Best Architecture Award (Finalist), 2010 China Architecture Media Award, Kindergarten in Jiading New Town
- 2009 Winner, 2009 Business Week/ Architectural Record China Awards, Plot 6 of Jishan Base in Jiangsu Software Park
- 2008 Best Young Architect Award (Finalist), 2009 China Architecture Media Award
- 2006 Excellence award, 2006 WA China Architecture Awards, Xiayu Kindergarten in Qingpu New Town
- 2006 Honorable award, 2006 WA China Architecture Awards, Office Building of Qingpu Private Enterprise Association
- 2006 Winner, 2006 Business Week/ Architectural Record China Awards, Office Building of Qingpu Private Enterprise Association
