= Zhong Xunzheng =

Chinese architect (1929–2023)

- 钟训正
- Born: 9 July 1929; Wugang County, Hunan, China
- Died: 22 June 2023 (aged 93); Nanjing, Jiangsu, China
- Education: Southeast University School of Architecture
- Scientific career
- Fields: Architecture
- Workplaces: Southeast University

Chinese name
- Simplified Chinese: 钟训正
- Traditional Chinese: 鐘訓正
Transcriptions
Standard Mandarin
- Hanyu Pinyin: Zhōng Xùnzhèng

Zhong Xunzheng (Chinese: 钟训正; 9 July 1929 – 22 June 2023) was a Chinese architect, and an academician of the Chinese Academy of Engineering.

== Biography ==
Zhong was born in Wugang County (now Wugang), Hunan, on 9 July 1929. In 1948, he enrolled at National Central University, and graduated from Nanjing University (now Southeast University School of Architecture) in 1952.

After university, he taught at Hunan University and soon moved to the Water Conservancy College of Wuhan University the next year. In November 1954, he joined the faculty of Nanjing Institute of Technology (now Southeast University).

Zhong died in Nanjing, Jiangsu on 22 June 2023, at the age of 93.

== Honours and awards ==
- November 1997 Member of the Chinese Academy of Engineering (CAE)
