= Yang Shi'e =

Chinese engineer (1931–2024)

- 杨士莪
- Born: 9 August 1931; British concession of Tianjin, China
- Died: 19 March 2024 (aged 92); Harbin, Heilongjiang, China
- Education: Tsinghua University; Andreyev Acoustics Institute
- Scientific career
- Fields: Underwater acoustic engineering
- Workplaces: Harbin Engineering University

Chinese name
- Simplified Chinese: 杨士莪
- Traditional Chinese: 楊士莪
Transcriptions
Standard Mandarin
- Hanyu Pinyin: Yáng Shì'é

Yang Shi'e (Chinese: 杨士莪; 9 August 1931 – 19 March 2024) was a Chinese engineer who was vice president of Harbin Institute of Shipbuilding Engineering (now Harbin Engineering University) from 1982 to 1987, and an academician of the Chinese Academy of Engineering. He was one of the founders of China's underwater acoustic engineering discipline.

== Biography ==
Yang was born in the British concession of Tianjin, on 9 August 1931, to Yang Tingbao, an architect and an academician of the Chinese Academy of Sciences, and Chen Faqing (陈法清). His grandfather Yang Heting was a politician who was magistrate of Nanyang Prefecture during the Republic of China. He attended Chongqing Nankai Secondary School and the High School Affiliated to National Central University. In 1947, he enrolled at Tsinghua University, where he majored in the Department of Physics.

After university in 1950, he taught at Dalian First Naval School and participated in the establishment of the People's Liberation Army Military Engineering University (Harbin Military Engineering University) in December 1952. He joined the Chinese Communist Party (CCP) in 1956. He studied at the Andreyev Acoustics Institute between 1957 and 1959. He returned to China in November 1959 and continued to teach at the People's Liberation Army Military Engineering University.

Yang was recruited as a professor of Northwestern Polytechnical University in 2000.

On 19 March 2024, he died in Harbin, Heilongjiang, at the age of 92.

== Honours and awards ==
- July 1995 Member of the Chinese Academy of Engineering (CAE)
- 1998 State Science and Technology Progress Award (Second Class) for the Shipborne Torpedo Trajectory Tracking and Measurement System
- 2009 State Science and Technology Progress Award (Second Class) for the Low Noise Measurement Methods and Systems
