= Cai Weilian =

Chinese painter

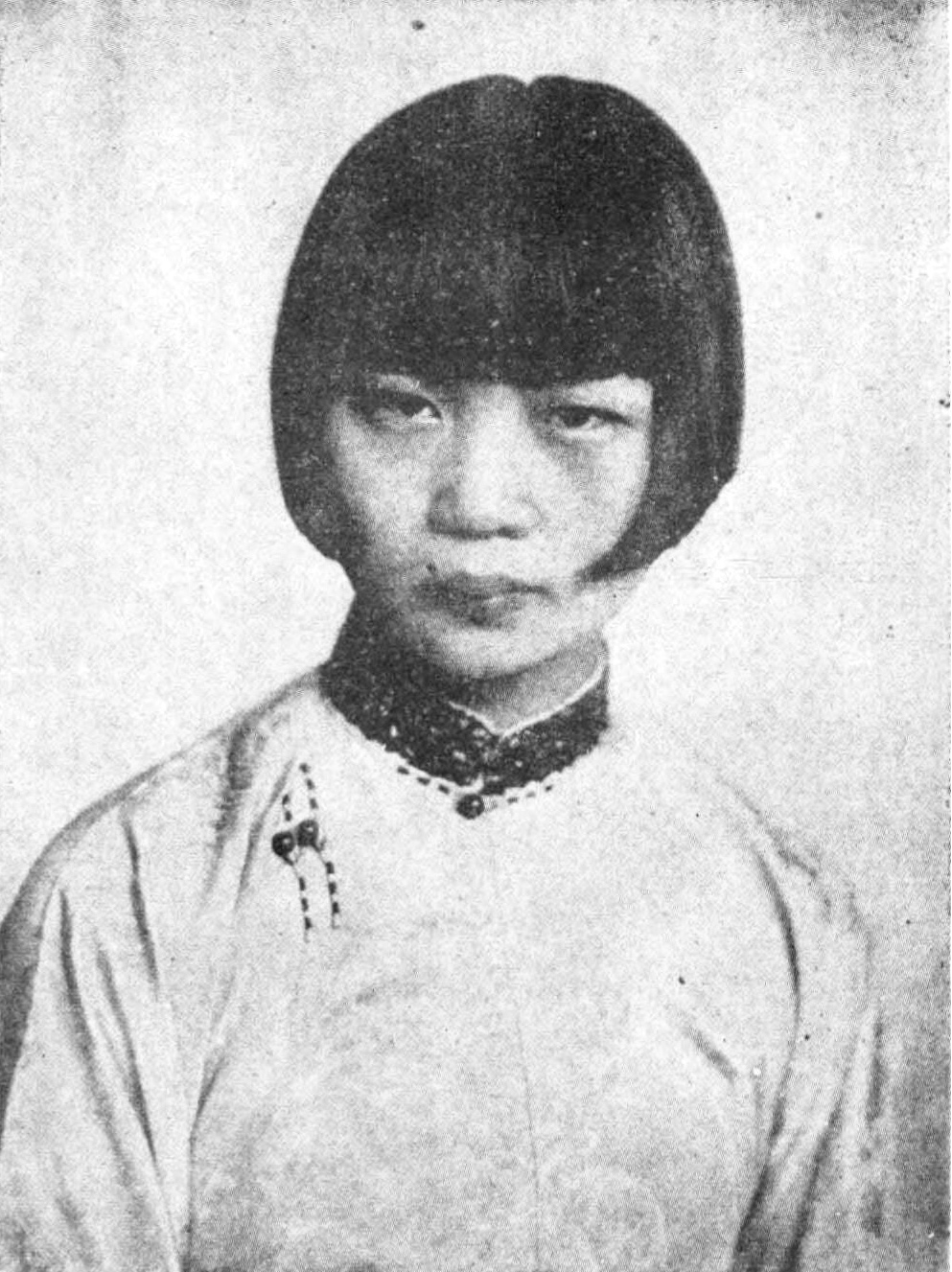
- Cai Weilian, c. 1928
- Born: 1904; Shaoxing, Zhejiang, China
- Died: 1939 (aged 34–35); Kunming, Yunnan, China
- Occupation: Painter
- Spouse: Lin Wenzheng

Cai Weilian (Chinese: 蔡威廉; 1904–1940) was a Chinese oil painter and professor.

== Early life ==
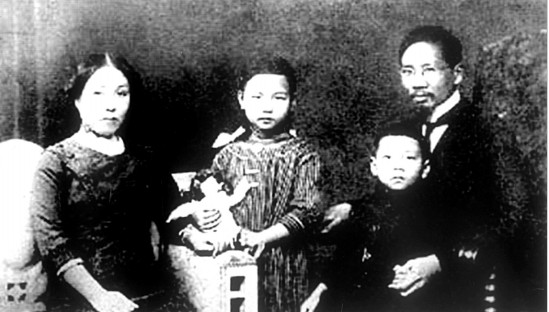
A young Cai Weilian with parents and siblings in Germany, c. September 1912.

Cai Weilian was born and raised in Shaoxing, Zhejiang; of Chinese philosopher Cai Yuanpei's seven children, Weilian was reportedly his favourite. She studied oil painting in both Belgium and France.

== Career ==
Cai specialised in modernist oil painting and became a professor at the Hangzhou-based National Academy of Art in 1928.

== Later years ==
Cai Weilian married fellow artist Lin Wenzheng and relocated to Kunming, Yunnan. She died after childbirth in 1939.
