= Discovery College =

Private independent school in Hong Kong

Coordinates: 22.3038°N 114.0142°E

- 智新書院

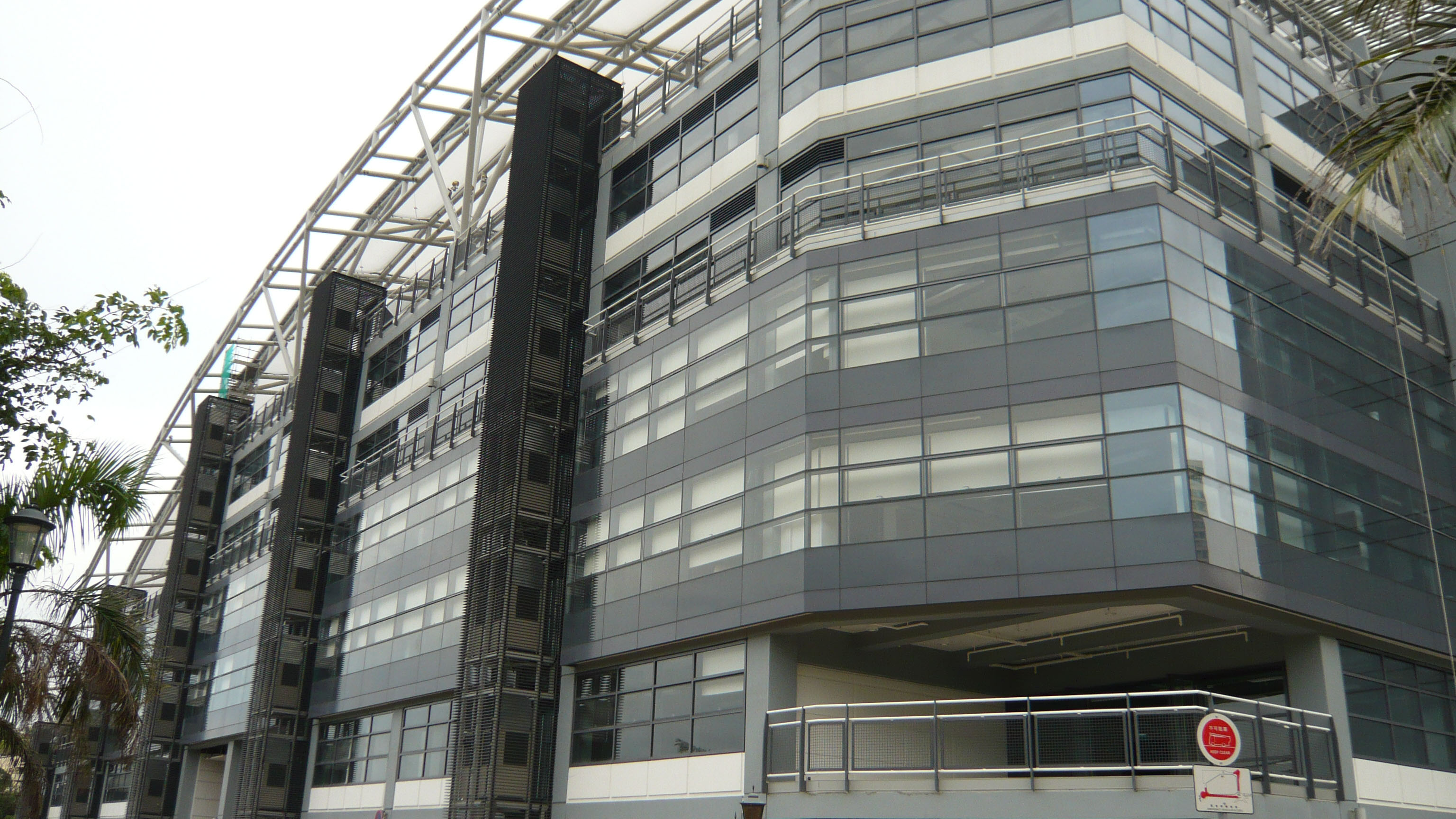
- Exterior of Discovery College.
- Yi Pak Bay, Discovery Bay, Lantau Island; Hong Kong

Information
- Type: Co-educational private primary and secondary school
- Established: August 2006
- Principal: Chloe Pollack
- Enrollment: 1,448
- Houses: Jin Shu (metal), Qing Mu (wood), Liu Shui (water), Lie Huo (fire) and Re Tu (earth)
- Colours: Red and grey
- Website: www.discovery.edu.hk

Discovery College
- Traditional Chinese: 智新書院
- Simplified Chinese: 智新书院
Transcriptions
Standard Mandarin
- Hanyu Pinyin: Zhì Xīn Shūyuàn
Yue: Cantonese
- Jyutping: zi3 san1 syu1 jyun6*2

Discovery College (Chinese: 智新書院) is a private independent school operated by the ESF in Discovery Bay, Hong Kong. It offers both primary and secondary education on one campus. The school first opened in August 2006 after replacing another ESF school, Bauhinia School, which first opened in January 2002. Discovery College has five houses, and provides education from year 1 to year 13.

Discovery College was established by the English Schools Foundation to serve the needs of the local and expatriate communities in Hong Kong. It is a full Years 1 to 13 school offering the International Baccalaureate (IB) Primary Years Programme (PYP) for Years 1-6, Middle Years Programme (MYP) for Years 7-11, and Diploma Programme (DP) for Years 12–13.

Under the Private Independent School Scheme, 70% of the students of Discovery College must be Hong Kong permanent residents.

== History ==
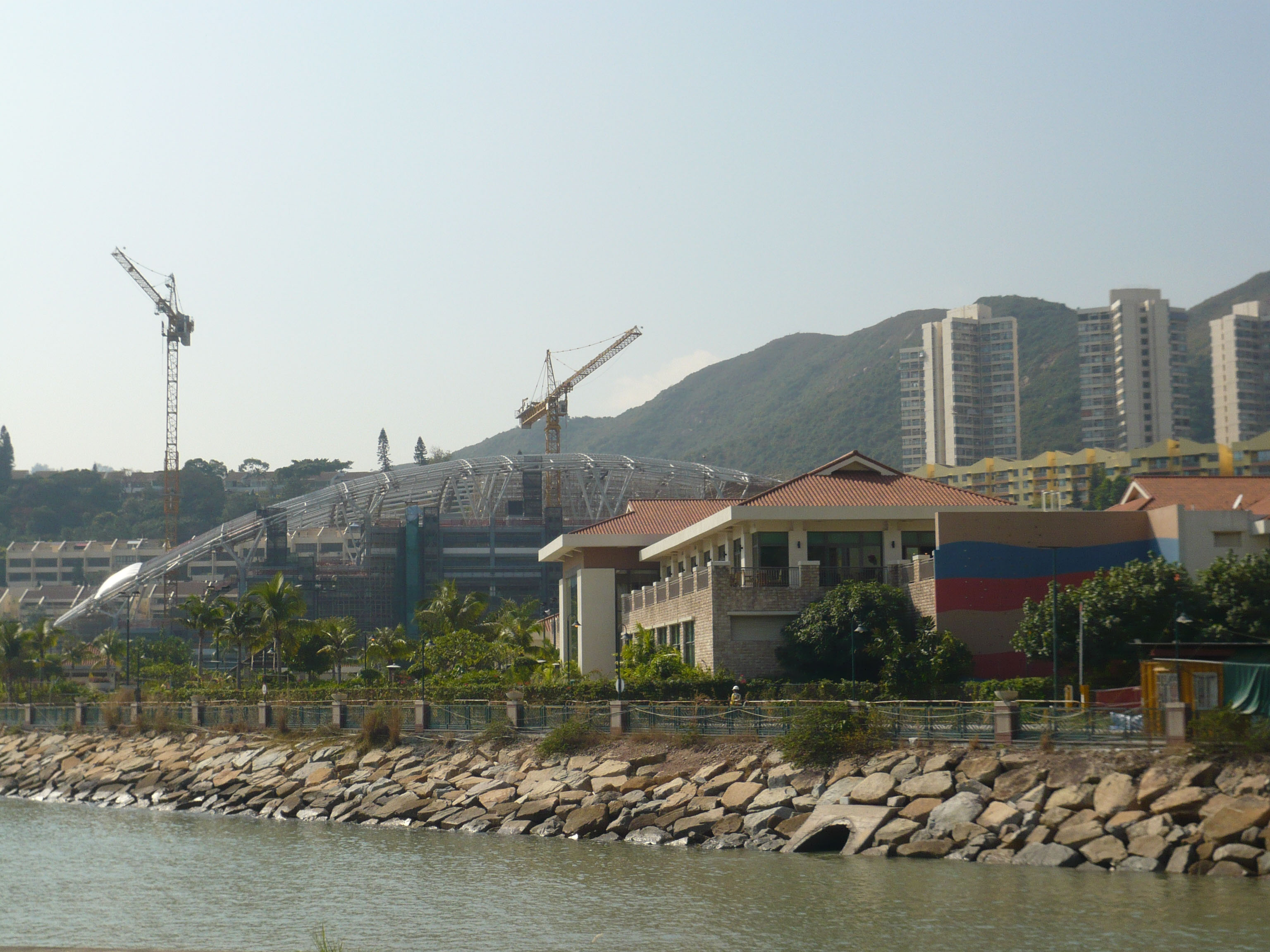
Discovery College being constructed next to Club Siena in Yi Pak Bay, Discovery Bay

Plans to set up Discovery College as one of ESF's first private schools began in 1999. As a private ESF school, Discovery College would not receive recurrent government subsidy. In 2001, the Education and Manpower Bureau (EMB) granted ESF a lot of land in Ma On Shan and another in Discovery Bay to build two primary-cum-secondary schools under the Private Independent School Scheme. The Discovery Bay site would eventually become the permanent campus of Discovery College.

Designed by Integrated Design Associates, the permanent campus was built between 2003 and 2008. The 70,000 sq ft campus cost HK$290 million, of which HK$137 million was granted by the Hong Kong Government. Operated by ESF Educational Services Limited (ESL), an ESF subsidiary, Discovery College needs to repay ESF its capital costs of HK$168 million within 20 years of opening.

In 2007, the primary section of Discovery College opened in a temporary site in Lai King, merging with former ESF primary school Bauhinia School. About two thirds of the school's students were transferred from Bauhinia School. The 450 students moved into the Discovery Bay campus when it began operation on 20 August 2008.

== Curriculum ==
Discovery College adopts a range of long-standing International Baccalaureate programmes: the Primary Years Programme (PYP), Middle Years Programme (MYP), Diploma Programme (DP), and the newly added Career-related Programme (CP), a curriculum for students aged 16–19 that is more personalized for those who are more certain of their future career paths.

== Access ==
Access is through Siena Avenue in Discovery Bay, which can be accessed by bus.
