= Chen Kuen Lee =

Chinese-German architect (1915–2003)

Chen Kuen Lee (May 23, 1915 in Zhejiang – September 14, 2003 in Berlin) was an architect of Chinese descent, working in Germany and Taiwan. He was a pupil and associate of Hans Scharoun. Lee is a representative of Organic Architecture within the Neues Bauen movement.

== Life ==
Chen Kuen Lee moved to Germany in 1931 and in the same year started to study architecture at the Technische Hochschule Berlin (now Technische Universität Berlin), from which he graduated in 1937. Simultaneously he worked in the studio of Hans Poelzig. He finished his diploma in 1939.

From 1939 to 1941 he was an associate of Hans Scharoun. Until 1943 he worked together with Hugo Häring on the idea of a Chinese Werkbund. In the years 1943 to 1947 he was an associate of Ernst Börschmann; from 1947 to 1953 he worked repeatedly with Hans Scharoun. Subsequently, he started his own business with offices in Berlin and Stuttgart. From 1981 onwards he taught as a visiting professor at Tunghai University in Taiwan. He relocated to Taiwan in 1988 in order to teach at various universities, but returned to Germany in 1996 where he lived up to his death in Berlin on September 14, 2003.

== Work ==
Lee concentrated mainly on residential housing, striving to consider the specifics of the respective location. The characteristics of his style include open and non-orthogonal floor plans and the interlocking of the buildings with their immediate and more distant surroundings. For this purpose he worked together with landscape architects for most of his projects from the very early planning stages on, among others with Hermann Mattern, Adolf Haag and Hannes Haag. With many of his buildings, inner and outer shapes interact by means of the continuation of lines of sight along sun rooms and water pools.

Lee's designs are oriented on the requirements of the functional processes within his buildings. By starting the design with the interior and moving outward the shape of the building becomes a result of fulfilling its functions, i.e. the floor plan is not subordinate to an arbitrary outer shape. The free floor plan designs could only be achieved by self-supporting constructions. Often the roof forms a landscape folded in various directions with multiple vistas into the surroundings and with different actions of light.

By providing interior spaces with different ambient qualities for the users open floor plans with interleaving rooms were created. For many of his buildings Lee himself took care of the interior design. Numerous designs for furniture, lighting, and other fitments were created.

Lee finished 63 buildings; in addition, there are around 40 draft designs that have not been realized. Besides his residential buildings he designed several industrial plants as well as the interior of Chinese restaurants in Berlin, Karlsruhe, Stuttgart, and Munich.

Chen Kuen Lee is the author of several essays and two books published in Taiwan on the Neues Bauen movement, the principles of which are explained by taking various buildings designed by him as examples.

== Buildings (selection) ==
- House Scharf (Oberstdorf, 1953)
- House Ketterer (Stuttgart, 1954–55)
- House Straub sr. (Knittlingen, 1956–57)
- House Schmidt (Giengen an der Brenz, 1960)
- Apartment house (Stuttgart, 1961–62)
- Residential buildings Märkisches Viertel (Berlin, 1965–70)
- House Audry (Luxembourg, 1967–69)
- House Straub jr. (Knittlingen, 1975–78)
- House Dr. Gärtner (Bretten, 1976–81)

== Writings ==
- Lee, Chen Kuen: gestern – heute – morgen (address for the inauguration of new exhibition rooms of Behr Möbel GmbH). In: bauwelt (22/1958, p. 514).
- Lee, Chen Kuen: Antworten In: bauwelt (issue 47/48/1971: p. 1916 + 1918, Berlin).
- Lee, Chen Kuen: Gegensatz und Ergänzung zwischen Bauwerk und Landschaft – eine Betrachtung anhand der Schriften von Hugo Häring, ausgehend von der Zusammenarbeit mit Schülern Karl Försters In: Jacobshaagen, Axel; Sommer-Kempf, Karin (ed.): Beiträge zur Problematik der Beziehungen zwischen Freiraum und Bauwerk (Festschrift Herta Hammerbacher, Berlin 1975, S. 226–247).
- Lee, Chen-Kuan: xin jian zhu zhi yi yi (Bedeutung des Neuen Bauens). Taipei 1993.
- Lee, Chen-Kuan: xin jian zhu zhi yan jien (Entwicklung des Neuen Bauens. Taipei 1996.
- Lee, Chen-Kuan: xin jian zhu yu da zhueng wen hua (Neues Bauen und Massenkultur). unpublished; Taipei 1999.

== Estate ==
Part of his estate has been delivered to the Baukunstarchiv of the Akademie der Künste in Berlin.

== Literature ==
- Chelazzi, Giuliano: Equilibrio espressionista tra i tempi e gli spazi nell'opera di Chen Kuen Lee. In: L'architettura, cronache e storia (1/1985, p. 24-38).
- Häring, Hugo: Gespräch mit Chen Kuan Li über einige Dachprofile. In: Lauterbach, Heinrich; Joedicke, Jürgen: Hugo Häring – Schriften, Entwürfe, Bauten (Stuttgart 1965, p. 60-63).
- Institut für Auslandsbeziehungen (ed.): Chen Kuen Lee – Hauslandschaften – Organisches Bauen in Stuttgart, Berlin und Taiwan. Stuttgart 2015, ISBN 978-3-7828-1618-2.
- Koch, Michael: Chen Kuen Lee – Bauen als Lebensphilosophie (brochure issued for the exhibition in Architekturgalerie am Weißenhof, Fe 6 – Mar 17, 1985). Self-published, Stuttgart.
- Kögel, Eduard: Die Wohnlandschaften von Chen Kuen Lee. Ein Nachruf. In: archplus (2004, issue 168, p. 20-21).
- Schirren, Matthias: Chen Kuen Lee 1915–2003 (Nachruf). In: bauwelt (Heft 37/2003, p. 4, Berlin).
- Thiele, Klaus-Jakob: Bauen – eine Auslegung des Lebens. In: bauwelt (issue 50/1963, p. 1487-1495, Berlin).
- Wang, Wen-chi: Lee Chen-kuan (1914–2003) und der chinesische Werkbund – Gemeinsame interkulturelle Geistesentwicklung mit Hugo Häring und Hans Scharoun (Ph.D. thesis, TU Berlin, 2009).
