= Dai Fudong =

Chinese architect (1928–2018)

Dai Fudong (Chinese: 戴复东; 25 April 1928 – 25 February 2018) was a Chinese architect. He was a lifelong professor of Tongji University and the founding director of the university's Institute of High-tech Building Technology. He was elected an academician of the Chinese Academy of Engineering in 1999. He emphasized the use of local and natural materials in his designs, and summarized his design philosophy as "modern bones, traditional soul, and natural clothing". Over a career spanning more than 50 years, Dai and his wife Wu Lusheng designed about 100 projects together.

== Early life and education ==
Dai was born on 25 April 1928 in Guangzhou, Guangdong, Republic of China, with his ancestral home in Wuwei, Anhui. He was the eldest son of Kuomintang general Dai Anlan and his wife Wang Hexin (王荷馨). When he was 13, his father died in the Burma Campaign of World War II, and his mother donated the entire death benefit of Fabi $200,000 she received from the government to build the Anlan Memorial School in Quanzhou, Guangxi. The family later fell into financial difficulty as Wang raised four children on her own. Although Dai Fudong was interested in painting, he decided to study architecture so he could support the family.

Dai studied at Tsinghua High School in Guiyang, where many of China's top scholars took refuge during the Second Sino-Japanese War. In 1948, he entered the Department of Architecture of National Central University (now Southeast University School of Architecture). After graduating in 1952, he was assigned by the new Communist government to teach at Tongji University in Shanghai, and spent his entire career there. His classmate Wu Lusheng was also assigned to Tongji, and they married the following year.

== Early career: designing Mao's Villa ==
In 1958, Dai, Wu, and their colleague Fu Xinqi were appointed co-designers of the Meiling (梅岭) Guesthouse at the East Lake in Wuhan. Halfway through the project, they were invited to watch a performance with Mao Zedong, and were told that the guesthouse would be Mao's personal villa in Wuhan. Mao spent much of his later years at Meiling; Dai and Wu did not see the completed building until 1978, when it was opened to the public as a tourist attraction after Mao's death.

== Life in the United States ==
In 1983, Dai went to Columbia University in the United States as a visiting scholar. The next year, the Chinese-American architect I. M. Pei, who had just won the Pritzker Prize, used the prize money to establish a scholarship for Chinese architects, and Dai was chosen as the first recipient. He spent the $2,000 scholarship travelling around the United States by Greyhound Bus, visiting 32 cities.

While in the US, Dai wrote President Ronald Reagan to request a reissue of the Legion of Merit medal awarded by President Franklin D. Roosevelt to his father Dai Anlan, which had been destroyed during the Cultural Revolution. Having no contact in the US government, he simply addressed the letter to "President Reagan, White House, Washington DC". To his surprise, the US Army responded on behalf of the president and reissued the medal accompanied by a certificate. He later donated the medal and the certificate to the Military Museum of the Chinese People's Revolution.

== Later career and works ==
Over a career spanning more than half a century, Dai and his wife Wu Lusheng designed about 100 projects together. They specialized in small and medium-sized buildings including offices, hotels, and university buildings. They emphasized the use of local materials, strove to utilize limited resources for the maximum benefit, and focused on human comfort and artistic value. He summarized his design philosophy as "modern bones, traditional soul, and natural clothing" (现代骨、传统魂、自然衣). In an interview with Chinese media, Wu stated that Dai mainly focused on the overall design, and she on the detailed execution.

In 1988, Dai and Wu designed the architecture school of Tongji University in 1988. At the time Chinese universities were poorly financed; they were given a budget of only US$570,000 for the 9,767-square-metre (105,130 sq ft) building. The building was well received, and they were subsequently commissioned to design the university's Run Run Shaw Building and the Graduate School Building.

In 1992–1993, Dai and Wu designed the Big Dipper Mountain Village, a small hotel on the Shandong Peninsula with seven buildings. The buildings had modern interiors, but externally they were covered with local stones and roofs were covered with seaweed, a material used by local farmers for the roofs of their houses, and the pathways were paved with local pebbles with grass planted among them. Their design minimized the cost while giving the hotel a distinct local flavour. They also applied the same design philosophy to the International Hotel in Zunhua.

Dai founded the Institute of High-tech Building Technology at Tongji University to develop lightweight and sustainable construction materials, and served as its first director. He was elected an academician of the Chinese Academy of Engineering in 1999. In August 2006, he was conferred the Lifetime Achievement Award by the China Creative Studies Institute.

Dai published seven books, 107 research papers, and a translated book. He also held two patents.

== Death ==
On 25 February 2018, Dai Fudong died at Xinhua Hospital in Shanghai, at the age of 89.
