= Cheng Taining =

Chinese architect

- Born: 9 December 1935 (age 90); Nanjing, Jiangsu, China
- Education: Southeast University
- Occupation: Architect

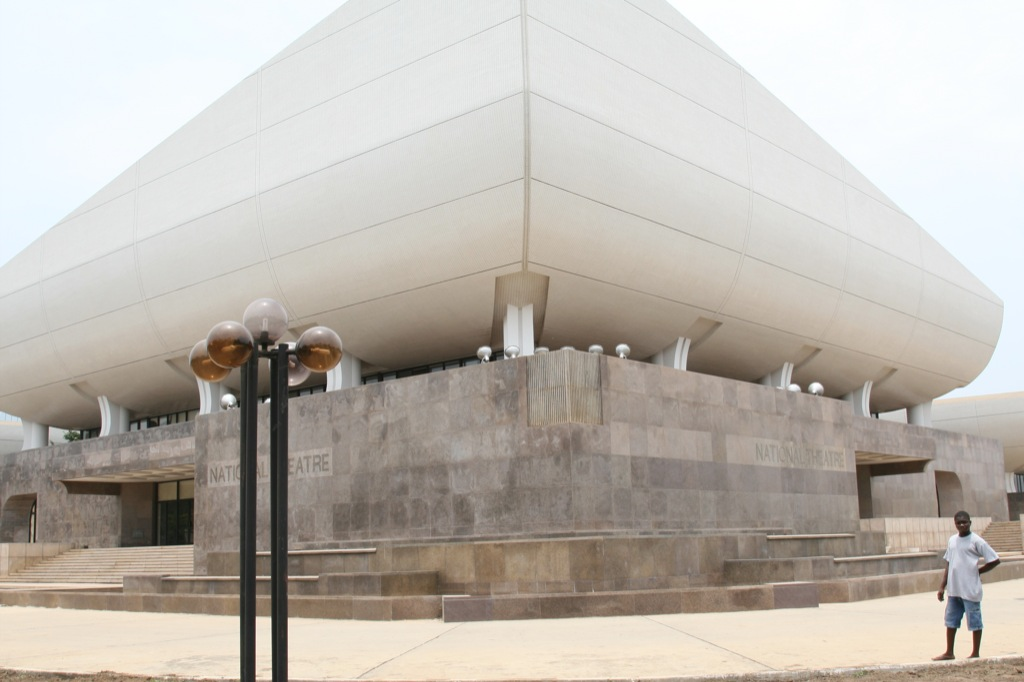
National Theatre of Ghana (1992)

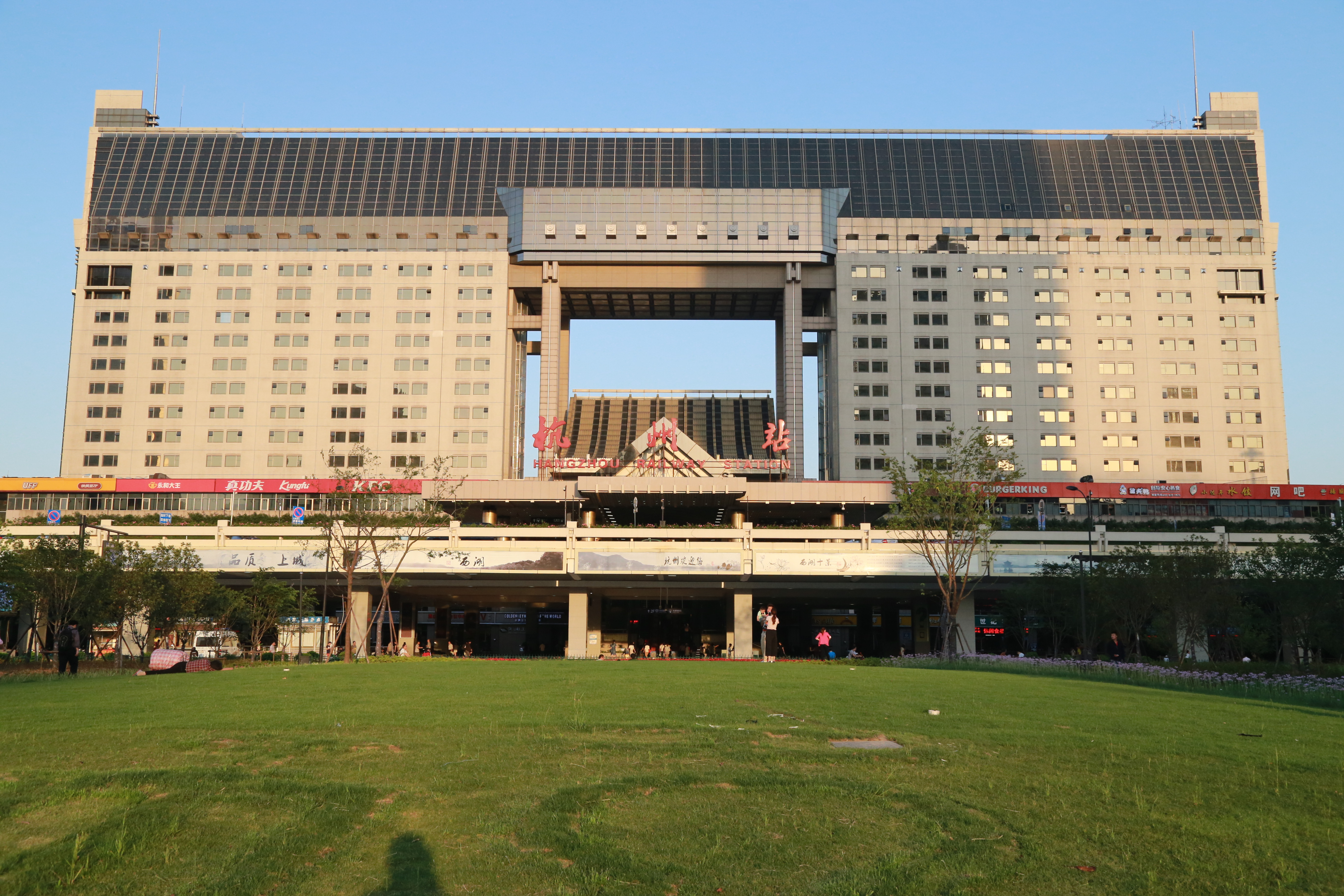
Hangzhou railway station (1999)

Cheng Taining (Chinese: 程泰宁; born 9 December 1935) is a Chinese architect. He is Director of the Design and Theoretical Research Center of Southeast University and Chief Architect of China United Engineering Corporation.

== Biography ==
Cheng was born 9 December 1935 in Nanjing, Jiangsu, China. He graduated from the School of Architecture of Nanjing Institute of Technology (now part of Southeast University). In 1984 Cheng became director and chief architect of the Hangzhou Architectural Design Institute. He won the Liang Sicheng Architecture Prize in 2004 and was elected a member of Chinese Academy of Engineering in 2005. His pieces were collected in 20th-Century World Architecture by International Union of Architects.

Cheng has designed more than 40 large-scale projects, including the National Theatre of Ghana, the Hangzhou railway station, National Assembly Building of Mali, Shaoxing Citizens' Square, Shaoxing Lu Xun Museum, and Haining Museum.
