= Huang Hui =

Chinese architect

- Education: Tsinghua University
- Occupation: Architect

Huang Hui is a Chinese architect. Huang lives and works in Beijing, China.

== Education ==
Huang graduated from Tsinghua University in 1961 with a degree in architecture.

== Career ==
Huang has been the recipient of the prize for Excellent Design from the Ministry of Housing and Urban-Rural Development and the Ministry of Environmental Protection of the People's Republic of China for her design of Beijing High School No.4.
