= Y. C. Wong =

American architect (1921–2000)

Yau-chun (Y.C.) Wong (1921–2000) was a Chinese-born American architect who practiced primarily in Chicago, Illinois. Wong was born in Canton, Guangdong, China, and earned a bachelor's degree in the Department of Architecture, National Central University (now Southeast University School of Architecture) in 1945. After immigrating to the United States, he furthered his study under Ludwig Mies van der Rohe at the Illinois Institute of Technology in Chicago. In 1951, he earned a master's degree and worked under Mies until 1959 when he started his own practice. Wong became known for his Atrium Houses during the 1960s. He is interred in the crypt at the First Unitarian Church of Chicago.
