= Poy Gum Lee =

Chinese-American architect (1900–1968)

- Born: January 14, 1900; New York City, U.S.
- Died: March 24, 1968 (aged 68); Bakersfield, California, U.S.
- Other names: Poy Lee, Lee Poy Gum, Jinpei Li
- Education: Pratt Institute
- Occupation: Architect
- Spouse: Pansy Choye Lee
- Children: 3
- Practice: Young Men’s Christian Association’s China Building Bureau, New York City Housing Authority
- Buildings: Chinese Consolidated Benevolent Association
- Projects: Sun Yat-sen Mausoleum, Sun Yat-sen Memorial Hall

Poy Gum Lee (Chinese: 李錦沛; pinyin: Lǐ Jǐnpèi; 1900–1968) was a Chinese-American architect. Lee is known for his Art Deco buildings with Chinese architectural influence or "Chinese Deco" in Shanghai as well as in Chinatown, Manhattan, New York City.

== Early life and education ==
On January 14, 1900, Lee was born at 13 Mott Street in Chinatown, Manhattan, New York City. Lee's parents were Lee Yick Dep and Ng Lan Yin (also known as Ng She); Lee was the eldest son of 11 children from his father's third marriage, but one of 16 siblings total. He grew up at 32 Mott Street above the family store in the Chinatown neighborhood in New York City.

In 1920, Lee earned a degree in Architecture from Pratt Institute. Lee took architecture extension classes at Massachusetts Institute of Technology (MIT) in 1921 and later at Columbia University in 1922.

== Career ==
During World War I, he served in the United States Army. By 1923, Lee and his family moved to China where he worked on various architecture projects and earned him admiration for his work. He worked as an architect in China for 25 years. Hired by the Young Men’s Christian Association’s China Building Bureau, he worked on 11 buildings for the YMCA and YWCA in China and also working on the Sun Yat-sen Mausoleum (1926-1929) and Sun Yat-sen Memorial Hall (1929-1931).

During World War II, Lee and his family lived in the French Concession neighborhood in Shanghai, China, where his home was confiscated by the Japanese. After World War II, Lee and his family returned to New York City in the United States.

Lee worked primarily in Manhattan's Chinatown after his return to the U.S. and worked with the New York City Housing Authority. Some of the postwar projects he worked on included the Chinese Consolidated Benevolent Association building in New York City (1959), On Leong Tong Merchant’s Association building (1948–1950), Kimlau War Memorial in Kimlau Square (1962), and Pagoda Theatre (1963).

== Personal life ==
In 1926, Lee married Pansy Choye in Shanghai, China. They have three daughters.

On March 24, 1968, Lee died in Bakersfield, California. He was 68 years old. Lee is buried at Greenlawn Cemetery in Bakersfield, California.

== See also ==
- Liu Jipiao
- Robert Fan
