= Integrated Design Associates =

Hong Kong architectural firm

Integrated Design Associates (IDA)
- Industry: Architecture
- Founder: Winston Shu
- Headquarters: Hong Kong
- Key people: Winston Shu, Jochen Tombers, Ana Shu, Dick Mak, Ed Peter
- Website: http://www.ida-hk.com

Integrated Design Associates (IDA) is a Hong Kong–based architectural firm set up in 1999 by its founder and principal, Winston Shu. The company is known for their sustainable, "green" designs, and their main body of work comprises international airports.

== Concept, completed and future projects ==
=== Transportation ===
- Male International Airport, Maldives (projected 2014)
- Hanimaadhoo International Airport, Maldives (concept design)
- Rajiv Gandhi International Airport, Hyderabad, India (2008)
- Departure Kerb Canopy, Hong Kong International Airport, Hong Kong (2008)
- Jinan International Airport, Jinan, China (2005)
- Hong Kong International Airport Improvement Works, Hong Kong (2002)
- Beijing Capital International Airport, Beijing, China (concept design 2004)
- Shanghai Pu Dong International Airport Phase II, Shanghai, China (concept design)
- Shenzhen Bao An International Airport, Shenzhen, China (concept design)
- Dalian International Airport, Dalian, China (concept design)
- Shenzhen MTR, Shenzhen, China (concept design)
- Hong Kong Heliport, Hong Kong (2008)
- Indira Gandhi International Airport, Delhi, India (2010)
- Hong Kong Heliport, Hong Kong (2008)
- Mactan–Cebu International Airport Terminal 2, Cebu, Philippines (2018)

=== Retail, commercial, hotel ===
- Parkview Green (Hotel), Beijing, China (2012)
- Durban's Taichung Project, Taiwan (concept design)

=== Office ===
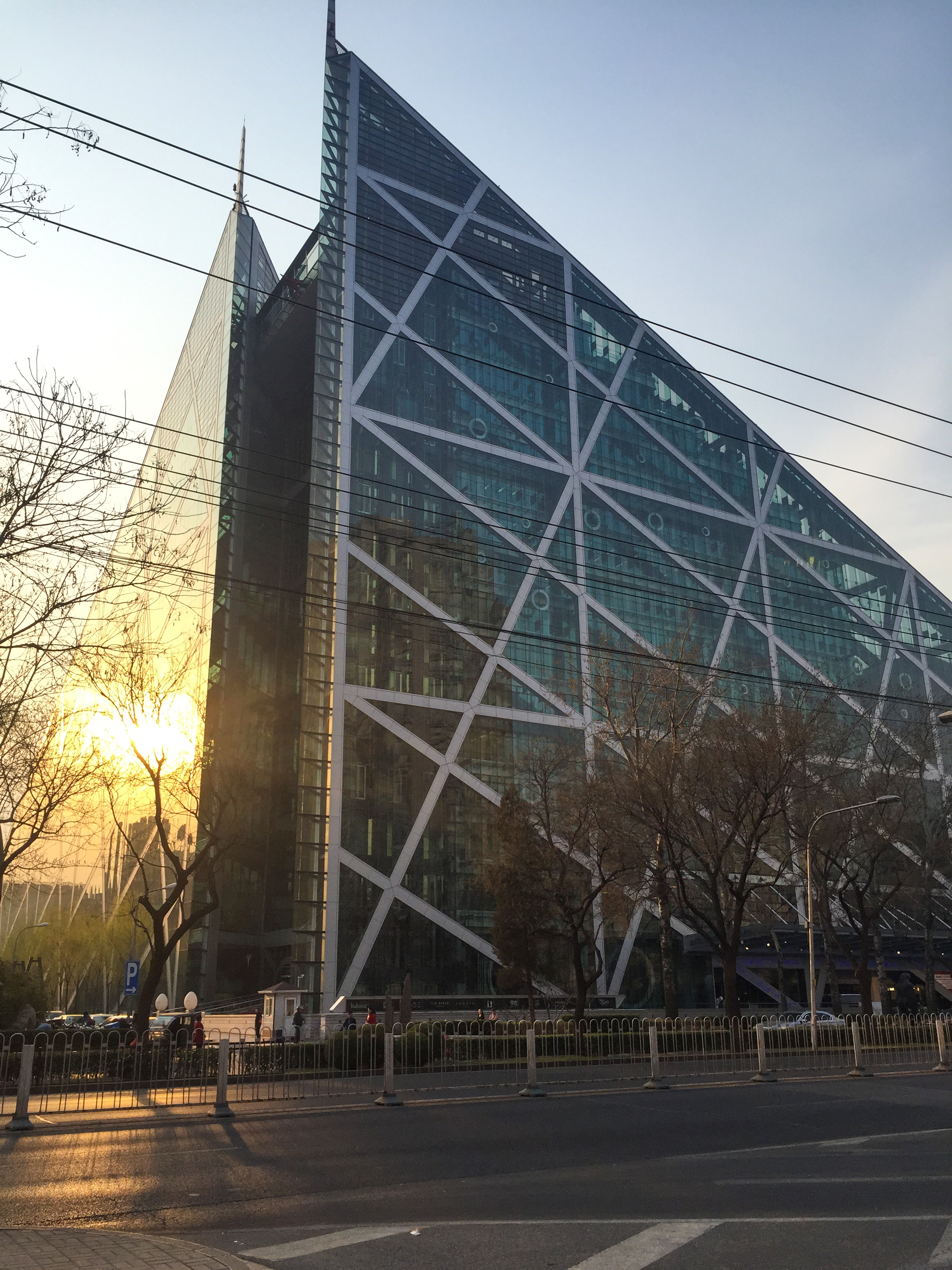
Parkview Green in Beijing

- Parkview Green (Office), Beijing, China (2012)
- The Cameron, 33 Cameron Road, Hong Kong (2008)
- Nortel Wangjing Campus, Beijing, China (2006)
- Sinochem Head Office, Beijing, China (2002)
- Shanghai North Bund Huishan Office Towers B1 and B2, Shanghai, China

=== Institutional ===
- ESF Discovery College, Discovery Bay, Hong Kong (2008)
- Hong Kong Housing Authority Exhibition Centre, Hong Kong (2001)

=== Residential ===
- One LaSalle, Kowloon Tong, Hong Kong (2008)

=== Industrial ===
- Hong Kong Business Aviation Centre Hangar, Hong Kong (2007)
- ISA Tianjin Technology Park, Tianjin, China (2007)

== Awards ==
- HKIA Merit Award Outside Hong Kong 2012 – Parkview Green
- Green Building Award Grand Award 2012 – Parkview Green
- International Green Awards 2011 – Parkview Green
- FuturArc Green Leadership Award 2011 – Parkview Green
- WAF Future Project of the Year 2011 – Hanimaadhoo Airport
- WAF Future Project Infrastructure 2011 – Hanimaadhoo Airport
- Perspective Awards Certificate of Excellence 2011 – Parkview Green
- AIA Merit Award 2010 – Hanimaadhoo Airport
- MIPIM Asia Green Building Award 2010 – Parkview Green
- AIA Merit Award for Un-built Project 2010 – Hanimaadhoo Airport
- Quality Building Award Finalist of Residential Category 2010 – One LaSalle
- Hong Kong Institute of Engineers Structural Excellence Award – ESF Discovery College
- LEED Platinum 2009 – Parkview Green
- Top 5 Best Airports Worldwide (Multiple Years) – Rajiv Gandhi International Airport
- AIA Merit Award for Interior Design 2002 – Hong Kong Housing Authority Exhibition Centre
- AIA Honor Award for Un-built Project 2001 – Shenzhen MTR Depot and Office Building
