= Lizhuang, Yibin =

Town in Sichuan province, China

Coordinates: 28.8084°N 104.7989°E

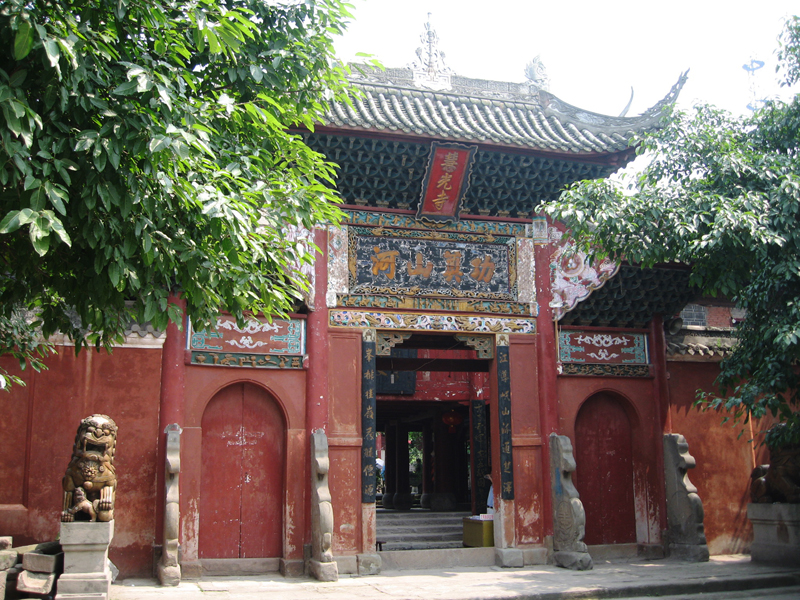
The Yuwanggong (Yuwang Temple) in Lizhuang

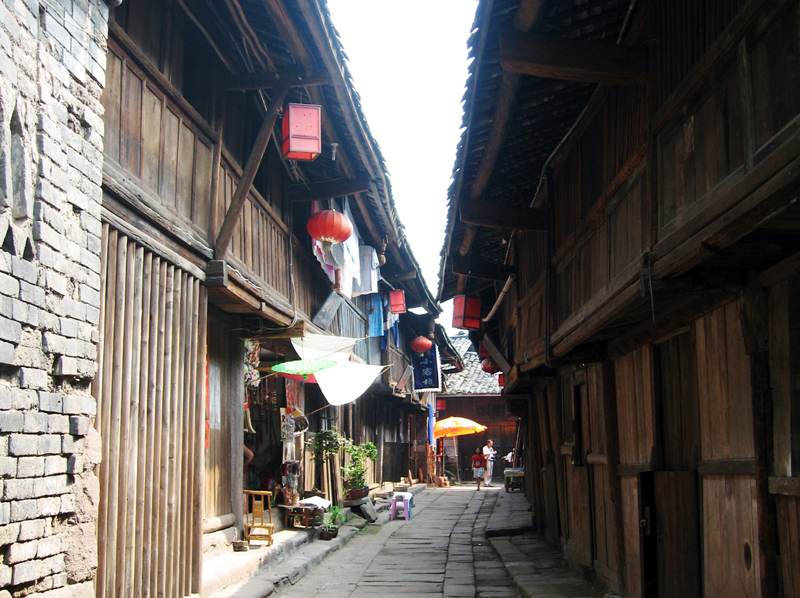
Street in Lizhuang

Lizhuang (李庄镇) is a historic town in Yibin, Sichuan Province, China.

Lizhuang was first established 1,800 years ago, although the present town was built during the Ming dynasty.

Lizhuang contains numerous preserved old streets and historic structure, including palaces and temples in classical styles, traditional courtyards, and narrow streets paved with blue stones. Lizhuang also contains many old temples and ancestral halls.

Yuwang Temple is a famous temple in Lizhuang and contains a large stone carving of nine dragons.

Other notable site is the main hall of the 200-year-old Ancestral Hall of the Zhang Family with 100 carved red-crowned cranes.

Lizhuang is famous for its role during the Second Sino-Japanese War. In 1937, after the Japanese launched a full-scale invasion of China, many academic institutions were forced to evacuate cities under attack, such as Shanghai and Beijing, and many of them relocated to the inland town of Lizhuang, including Tongji University.
