= Garcia Frankowski =

Puerto Rican and Scottish artist duo

- Known for: Painting, sculpture, installation art, artist's book
- Notable work: Pure Hardcore Icons: A Manifesto on Pure Form in Architecture; Shapes Islands Text: A Garcia Frankowski Manifesto
Cruz García
- Born: 27 June 1983 (age 43); San Juan, Puerto Rico
- Education: University of Puerto Rico
Nathalie Frankowski
- Born: 8 May 1985 (age 41); Dundee, Scotland
- Education: École nationale supérieure d'architecture de Paris-La Villette

Garcia Frankowski is an artist duo formed by Cruz García (born 1983 in San Juan, Puerto Rico) and Nathalie Frankowski (born 1985, Dundee, Scotland). Garcia and Frankowski worked in Beijing where they also direct WAI Think Tank and Intelligentsia Gallery, where they also work as curators. Currently, they work as associate professors at the Iowa State University College of Design.

== Background ==
Cruz García received a M.Arch Degree from the University of Puerto Rico while Nathalie Frankowski obtained a State Diploma of Architecture specialized in research from the Department of Art, Architecture and Philosophy of the École nationale supérieure d'architecture de Paris-La Villette.

Garcia Frankowski was founded after their members started working together in Brussels in 2008. In 2009 they relocated to Beijing.

== Work ==
The work of Garcia Frankowski includes painting, mix media, book making, collage, animations, and large scale installations. Recent exhibitions include group shows at the Museum of Modern Art in New York, the Chinese Centre for Contemporary Art in Manchester, the Kunst-Werke Institute for Contemporary Art in Berlin, the Vitra Design Museum in Weil am Rhein, Star Gallery, Intelligentsia Gallery and Pifo New Art Gallery in Beijing.

Recent publications include the artist's book Shapes, Islands, Texts: A Garcia Frankowski Manifesto, the book Pure Hardcore Icons: A Manifesto on Pure Form in Architecture, the children's book The Story of the Little Girl and the Sun, as well as several unique artist's books as well as the architectural magazine What About It?

The Work of Cruz García and Nathalie Frankowski has been selected to participate at the 1st Chicago Architecture Biennial and the 1st Changjian Video and Photography Biennale at the Chongqin Changjian Museum of Contemporary Art. Their work has been exhibited in New York, Los Angeles, Columbus, Chicago, Michigan, Barcelona, Madrid, Bratislava, Buenos Aires, San Juan, Montevideo, Guadalajara, Zurich, London, Beijing, Shanghai, Tokyo, Osaka, Milan, Moscow, Venice, Istanbul, Prague, Helsinki, Paris, Sydney, Melbourne, Lisbon and Porto.

Recent curatorial projects include several exhibitions at Intelligentsia Gallery, among them Softcore: Subverted Superstructure and the Systemic Sublime, and the group exhibition about independent magazines and artist's books Paper Manifestoes presented during the 2014 edition of Beijing Design Week.

== Publications ==
- Cruz García & Nathalie Frankowski, "Shapes, Islands, Texts: A Garcia Frankowski Manifesto", (Vibok Works: Sevilla, 2014) ISBN 978-84-941464-7-3
- Cruz García & Nathalie Frankowski, "Pure Hardcore Icons: A Manifesto on Pure Form in Architecture", (Artifice Books on Architecture: London, 2013). ISBN 978-1-908967-39-8
