= Sun-chang Lo =

Photographer and architect

Sun-chang Lo is a photographer, artist, architect.

== Early life ==
Sun-chang Lo is a Chinese American photographer, artist, architect. Born in Guangzhou, China, and has lived and studied in Taiwan, Japan, Hong Kong and the United States.

Following graduation from the Cooper Union, New York City, in 1972, he was a recipient of the Japanese Monbukagakusho Scholarship from 1974 to 1976. While studying under Professor Kazuo Shinohara at the Tokyo Institute of Technology, analysis and synthesis of the theories and histories of Chinese and Japanese architecture landed him two consecutive awards in the 1975 and 1976 Japan Architect International Residential Competitions.

== Architecture, design and photography ==
From 1977 to 1979, while participating in the Lukang Landmark Preservation Project, he taught architecture and design at Tunghai University, Taiwan. Back in his New York City home base, he and his wife/partner, Jean, pursued a multi-discipline design practice ranging from architecture, interior, fashion and graphic design, to photography, surveying and model making.

From 1993 to 2008 he taught art and architecture, design, drawing and photography at the Department of Architecture at the University of Hong Kong.

Despite Sun-chang's stylistic consistency, the artistic content of his photography holds inexhaustible possibilities awaiting endless explorations. With each scrutiny, one is always able to discover previously undetected profundities... Vague semblance is the phenomenon of the impalpable and the incommensurable, and is an incarnation of Tao. Sun-chang's latest work is at the threshold of Tao. – Pao-teh Han, director Museum of World Religions

== Currently ==
In 2008, Sun-chang Lo was referenced in the Hong Kong Art Archive.

He is now a freelance architect/artist/photographer living in New York City.

== Books ==
- Hong Kong: A Micro Vision/Photographs Sun-chang Lo Illustrated. 124 pages. The University Museum and Art Gallery, The University of Hong Kong. ISBN 962-8038-03-6
- Hong Kong: A Macro Vision/Drawings Sun-chang Lo Illustrated. 120 pages. The University Museum and Art Gallery, The University of Hong Kong. ISBN 962-8038-12-5
- Metropolis: A Prime Vision/Photographs Sun-chang Lo Illustrated. 136 pages. The University Museum and Art Gallery, The University of Hong Kong. ISBN 962-8038-21-4
- Metropolis: An Omni Vision/Drawings Sun-chang Lo Illustrated. 104 pages. The University Museum and Art Gallery, The University of Hong Kong. ISBN 962-8038-24-9
- Pilgrimage : A Naked Vision/Photographs Sun-chang Lo Illustrated. 132 pages. The University Museum and Art Gallery, The University of Hong Kong. ISBN 962-8038-27-3
- 16 Lessons in Lines: 50th Anniversary Exhibition, Illustrated. 250 pages. The University Museum and Art Gallery, The University of Hong Kong. ISBN 962-8038-08-7
- Mindscape: An Epic Vision/Photographs Sun-chang Lo Illustrated. 132 pages. The University Museum and Art Gallery, The University of Hong Kong. ISBN 962-8038-44-3
- Sun-chang Lo’s Metropolis Sun-chang Lo Illustrated. 72 pages. Cultural & Recreational Services of the Civic & Municipal Affairs Bureau, Macau

== Exhibitions ==
=== Solo ===
- Mindscape: An Epic Vision/Photographs by Sun-chang Lo
- Creek Art, Shanghai, 2008.
- Sun-chang Lo's Metropolis
- The Taipa Houses Museum, Macau, 2004.
- Nudes and Naked Calligraphy/Works by Jean and Sun-chang Lo
- The University Museum and Art Gallery, The University of Hong Kong, 2003.
- Metropolis: A Prime Vision/Photographs by Sun-chang Lo
- Kwai Fung Hin Art Gallery, Hong Kong, 2001.
- Metropolis: A Prime Vision/Photographs by Sun-chang Lo
- Edward Carter Gallery, New York, 2001.
- Metropolis: Fotografias e Desenhos de Sun-chang Lo
- Galeria da Livraria Portuguesa, Instituto Português do Oriente, Macau, 2001.
- Photography by Sun-chang Lo
- Art Sites Gallery, Greenport, New York, 2000.
- Hong Kong: A Macro Vision/Drawings by Sun-chang Lo
- The University Museum and Art Gallery, The University of Hong Kong, 1997.
- Hong Kong: A Micro Vision/Photographs by Sun-chang Lo
- Princeton University, 1996.
- Hong Kong: A Micro Vision/Photographs by Sun-chang Lo
- The University Museum and Art Gallery, The University of Hong Kong, 1995.

=== Group ===
- Hong Kong & Shenzhen Bi-City Biennale of Urbanism/Architecture
- Central, Hong Kong, 2008.
- Lianzhou International Photo Festival
- Lianzhou, Guangdong, China, 2007.
- Lishui International Photo Festival
- Lishui, Zhejiang, China, 2007.
- 16 Lessons in Lines
- The University Museum and Art Gallery, The University of Hong Kong, 1999.
- Five Contemporary Chinese Photographers
- The Rotunda, Exchange Square, Hong Kong, 1997
