= Rui Fu Xiang =

Chinese silk store chain

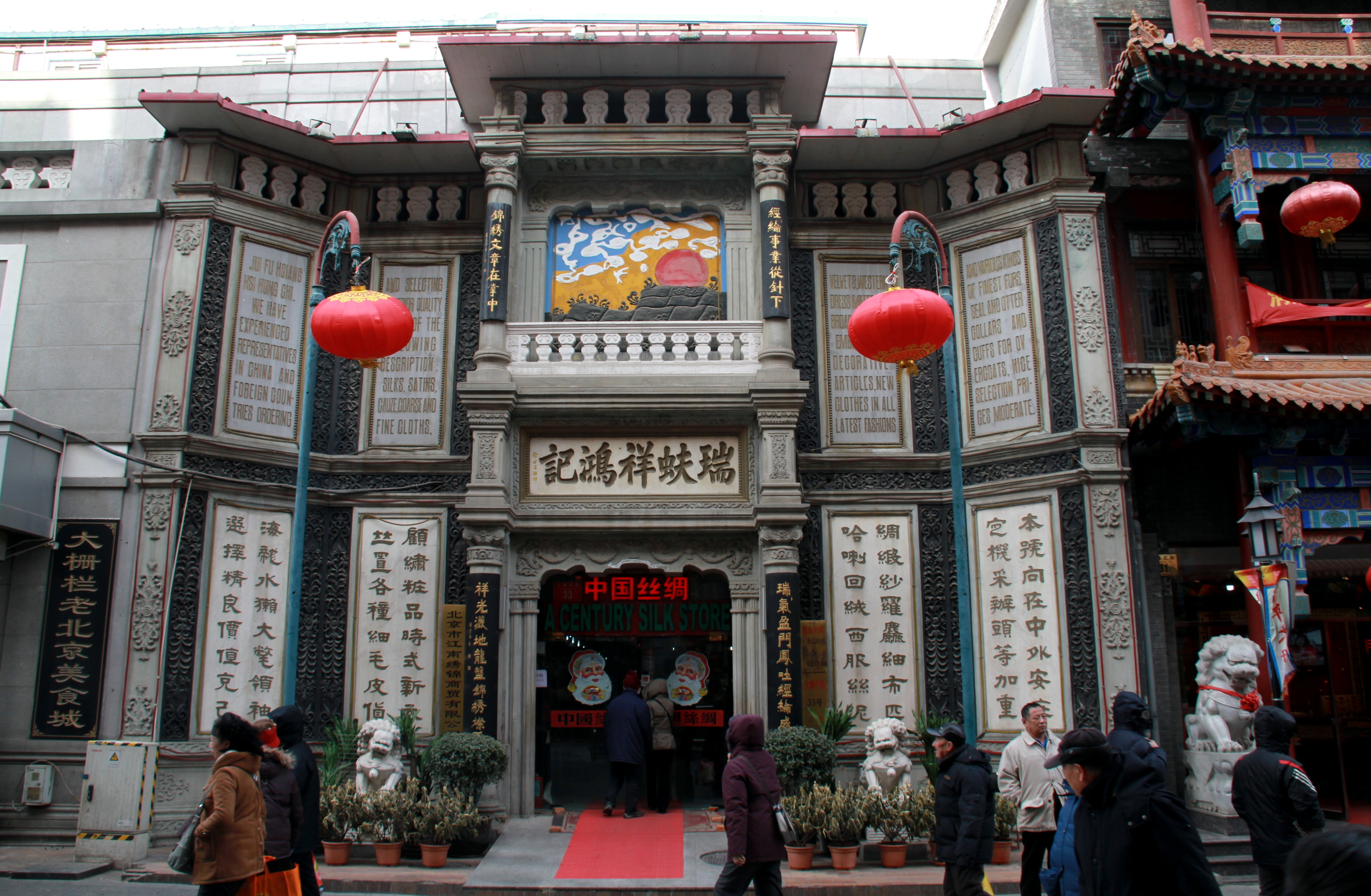
Ruifuxiang silk store in Beijing

The Ruifuxiang Silk Store (Chinese: 瑞蚨祥绸布店; pinyin: Ruì Fú Xiáng Chóu Bù Diàn) is a chain of silk stores in eastern China.

The Ruifuxiang stores were founded by Meng Hongsheng, a descendant of the Confucian philosopher Mencius (Chinese family name Meng) from Jiujun County to the north of Zhangqiu City, Shandong Province.

The Meng family had been in the clothing business since the reign of the Kangxi Emperor (1661-1722). In the beginning, Meng Hongsheng traded in a locally produced coarse cloth that was popular among peasants for its durability and low price. Accordingly, the business strategy was based on large sales volumes and small profit margins. Later Meng Hongsheng set up chain stores in cities such as Shanghai, Qingdao, Tianjin and began to extend his business into the market for luxury items like silk, satin, tea, and furs).

Most of the store names such as Ruifuxiang, Qianxiangyi, Quanxiang, Longxiang, Hongxiang, Ruishengxiang, Qingxiang contained the character "Xiang" (Chinese: 祥; pinyin: Xiáng) and were hence collectively known as the "Xiang stores". The name Ruifuxiang alludes to the "Qingfu" (青蚨), a legendary insect that could bring wealth, and also appears on some versions of the Rui Fu Xiang logo.

In 1862, the Mengs opened the Ruifuxiang store in the western part of Jinan that traded mainly in silk and satins. A branch in Beijing followed one year later. This branch store was destroyed in 1900, when the Eight-Nation Alliance invaded Beijing to put down the Boxer Rebellion. It was rebuilt shortly thereafter.

Business peaked in the 1920s and 1930s, when Meng Luochuan was at the helm of the family enterprise. By the 1940s, the Meng family business was made up of more than 96 stores and other ventures. These included 50 silk and 20 tea stores as well as pawnshops and banks. The Meng businesses were located in places such as Jinan, Qingdao, Yantai, Beijing, Tianjin, Baoding, Shenyang, Harbin, Suzhou, Hangzhou, and Fujian Province.

The first flag of People's Republic of China raised in Beijing's Tiananmen Square on 1 October 1949 was made from Ruifuxiang silk.

The business concept and management philosophy of the Ruifuxiang stores have been cited as a source of inspiration that Sam Walton used in the establishment of Wal-Mart.

== Stores ==
- 215 Jinger Street, Jinan, Shandong (Chinese: 经二路215号; pinyin: Jīng'èr Lù 215 hào), 36°39′49.39″N 116°59′3.48″E
- 5 Dashilangjie, Qianmenwai, Beijing, 39°53′40.50″N 116°23′27.38″E

== See also ==
- List of sites in Jinan
