= Yung Ho Chang =

Chinese-American architect

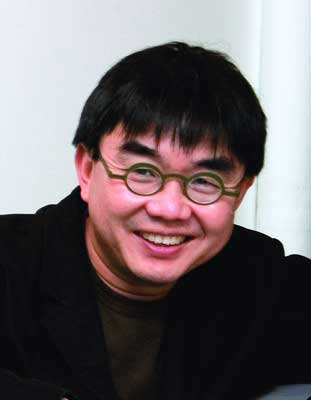
- Occupation: Architect
- Awards: New York Alliance of Architecture Award for young architects, 1992
- Practice: Atelier Feichang Jianzhu

Yung Ho Chang (Chinese: 张永和; pinyin: Zhang Yonghe) is a Chinese-American architect and Professor of MIT Architecture. He was formerly the head of the Department of Architecture at MIT. He is now Chair Professor and Dean of Faculty of Architecture in The University of Hong Kong.

He studied at the Nanjing Institute of Technology (now Southeast University) before moving to the US. Then he received his M.Arch. from the University of California, Berkeley, and taught in the US for 15 years before returning to Beijing to establish China's first private architecture firm, Atelier FCJZ. He has exhibited internationally as an artist as well as architect and is widely published, including the monograph Yung Ho Chang/Atelier Feichang Jianzhu: A Chinese Practice. His interdisciplinary research focuses on the city, materiality and tradition. He often combines his research activities with design commissions.

Before MIT, he was the Kenzo Tange Chair Professor at Harvard Graduate School of Design and the Eliel Saarinen Chair Professor at University of Michigan.

Chang was a jury member of the Pritzker Prize from 2011 to 2017.

Chang serve as Chair Professor (Architecture) in The University of Hong Kong since 2024.

Chang serve as Dean of Faculty of Architecture at The University of Hong Kong for a five-year term starting in 20 January 2025.

== Publications ==
In 1997, he published Feichang Architecture, an album of his works. In 2002, he published The Album for Feichang Jianzhu Atelier 1,2.

He has published many articles in journals including Architecture Today in France, The Art of the Moment in Italy, New Architecture and Space Design in Japan, Architecture in the U.S., Space in Korea and the World Architecture in Britain.

He facilitated a workshop session at the Holcim Forum 2007 for the Holcim Foundation with the title "Informal Urbanism".

== Awards ==
- Architectural Painting Award &Brown and Bakewell&Weihe in University of California, Berkeley
- Professor of Architecture, Ball State University, College of Architecture and Planning, 1983 ~1989
- The first prize of International Competition of the Design of Council House in Japan 1986
- First Place, Shinkenchiku Residential Design Competition Japan Architect, Japan 1986
- First Prize, From Table to Tablescape Design Competition, Formica Corporation, US 1988
- Walter B. Sanders Fellowship, University of Michigan 1988 ~ 89
- Winner, 3x3+9 Design Competition, AIA San Francisco Chapter & Architectural Foundation of San Francisco 1991
- Steedman Traveling Fellowship, Washington University in St. Louis 1992
- New York Alliance of Architecture, 1992 Award for young architects
- Progressive Architecture Citation Award 1996
- The 2000 UNESCO Prize for the Promotion of the Arts
- China Architectural Arts Award (Pingod Shopping Street) 2003
- WA Architectural Prize (Villa Shizilin) 2004
- China Architectural Arts Award (Hebei Education Publishing House) 2004
- Business Week/ Architectural Record China Award (Villa Shizilin) 2006
