= Liu Jipiao =

Chinese architect

- Born: June 4, 1900; Meizhou, Guangdong, China
- Died: 1992 (aged 91–92); Toms River, Ocean County, New Jersey, United States
- Other name: Teìpeìou Liou (in France)
- Education: University of Paris, L’Ecole Nationale des Beaux Arts
- Occupations: Architect, Realism Painter
- Known for: First Chinese Art Deco Architect
- Notable work: Carlton Building (Shanghai)
- Spouse: Pan Fengxiao
- Website: liujipiao.com

Liu Jipiao (Chinese: 刘既漂), (1900–1992) was a Chinese architect associated with the development of Art Deco architecture in China and an oil painter of Realism. Liu's approach to architecture was to create a modern design with a distinctive Chinese aesthetic. Liu is remembered as the first Chinese Art Deco architect.

== Early life and education ==
On June 4, 1900, Liu was born in Meizhou, Guangdong, China. Liu's family had wealth from owning a silk dying factory. At a young age Liu took an interest in porcelain as well as Chinese and Western painting.

In 1919, Liu studied at University of Paris and by 1922 he moved to L’Ecole Nationale des Beaux Arts to study architecture and interior design. He travelled to Paris with Chinese artists Lin Fengmian and Lin Wenzheng and he connected with Chinese artists living in Paris, such as Xu Beihong. Liu was in a Paris-based art club in college called Phoebus Society, with fellow artists; Lin Wenzheng (1903–1930), Wang Daizhi, and Wu Dayo (1903–1988).

== Career ==
In 1924, Liu exhibited fifteen paintings at Exposition Chinoise d’art ancien et moderne. He was then invited to contribute to China's pavilion section of the Exposition internationale des arts décoratifs et industriels modernes in 1925. His design for the entrance, which included a dragon and a phoenix, won awards from the French government. This new, modern design style presented at the expo became later known as Art Deco, and this expo was one of the earliest displays.

His large scale oil painting, Yang Guifei after the Bath is one of his better known painted works.

In 1929, Liu returned to China and become a professor at the Nanjing University. Between 1932 until 1937 he ran an architecture firm in the Nanjing, China, specializing in modern buildings. Liu received commissions to design residential buildings, including the Carlton Building on Huanghe Lu.

In the 1960s, some years after relocating to the United States, Liu resumed architecture and painting. He worked with architect Sergey Padyukov. His painting of U.S. president Lyndon Baines Johnson is in the LBJ presidential library.

== Personal life ==
In 1932 he married artist Pan Fengxiao. After the Japanese invasion of Manchuria and rise of communism in China, in 1947, Liu and his family fled from China to United States. In the United States, Liu ran a Laundromat and then a chicken farm before resuming architecture and painting. By 1965, Liu retired from architecture and focused more on fine arts like painting and watercolor.

In 1992, Liu died at the age of 92 in Toms River, New Jersey.

== See also ==
- Poy Gum Lee
- Robert Fan
