= Dashilan Subdistrict =

Subdistrict in Xicheng, Beijing

Dashilan Subdistrict 大栅栏街道
- Subdistrict
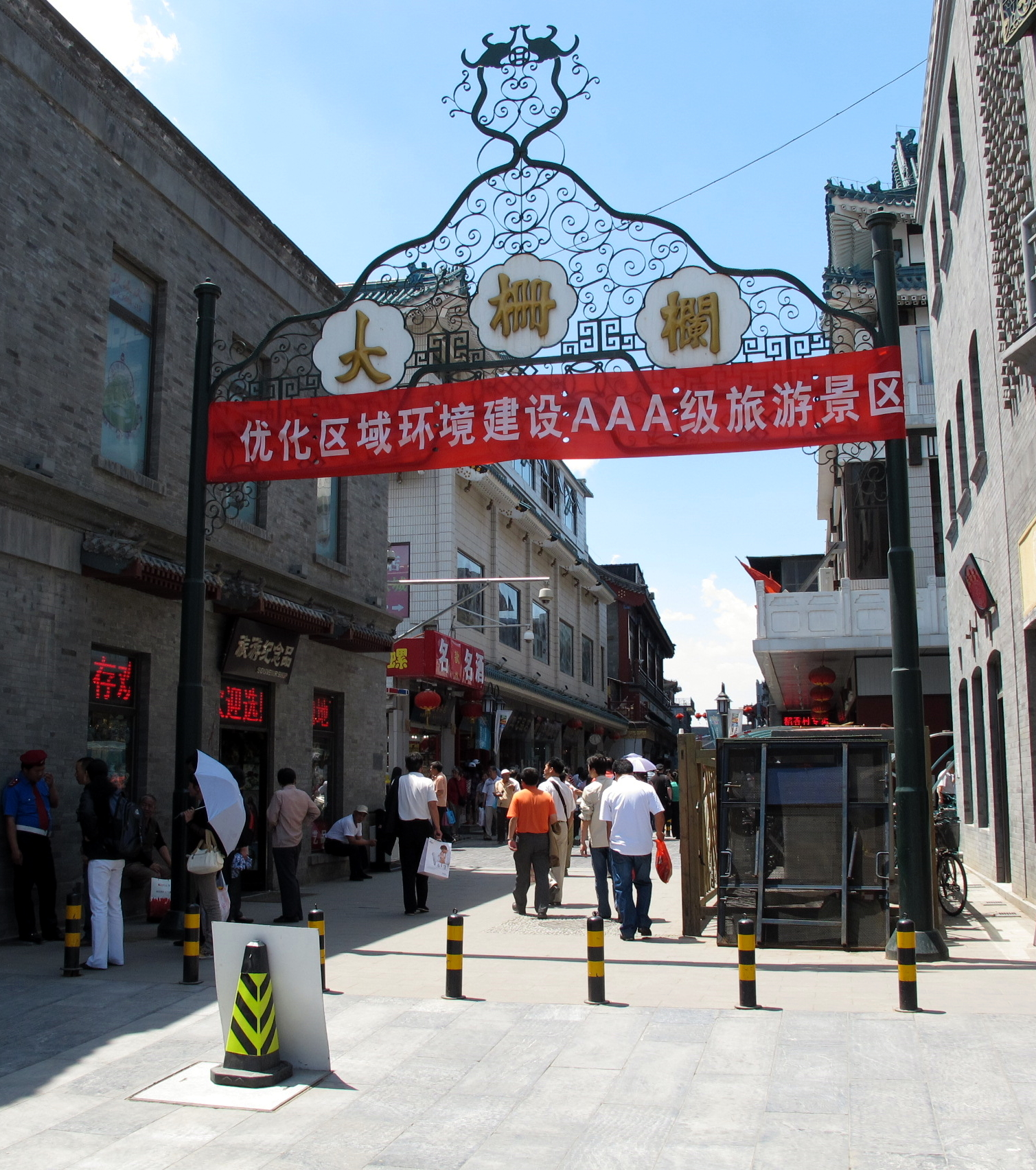
- Entrance to Dashilan, 2010

- Location within Beijing Location within China
- Coordinates: 39°54′34″N 116°23′35″E
- Country: China
- Municipality: Beijing
- District: Xicheng

Area
  - Total: 1.27 km^{2} (0.49 sq mi)

Population (2020)
  - Total: 28,985
  - Density: 22,800/km^{2} (59,100/sq mi)
- Time zone: UTC+8 (China Standard)
- Postal code: 100051
- Area code: 010

Dashilan Subdistrict (Chinese: 大栅栏街道; pinyin: Dàshilànr Jiēdào) (also known as Dashilanr or Dashilar with Erhua) is a subdistrict on eastern side of Xicheng District, in Beijing, China.

Dashilan is also a famous business street outside Qianmen. Now the term Dashilan is also used to refer to the area comprising, besides Dashilan itself, also the Langfang Toutiao Lane, Liangshidian Street and Meishi Street.

== Description ==
Dashilanr is located to the south of Tiananmen Square, west of Qianmen Street. The overall length of Dashilanr is 275 metres (902 ft) from east to west. Because of the overall improvement of business environment in Beijing, the heart of retail business is no longer in the area of Qianmen and the business position Dashilanr once held is also on the wane. Except some China Time-honored Brands (Chinese: 老字号; pinyin: Lǎo zìhào), most of the present shops and stores of Dashilanr are offering goods of poor qualities at low prices. Meanwhile, there are many lawless men perpetrating frauds and extortion on the street.

== History ==
In the Ming dynasty, the name "Dashilanr" had not yet been recorded in the work of Zhang Zhupo, "Blocks and Streets in the Five Boroughs of Beijing". Only Langfang Toutiao, Langfang Ertiao, Langfang Santiao and Langfang Sitiao existed to the west of the road which was outside Qianmen. Langfang Sitiao was located in the same place as modern-day Dashilanr. It can be inferred that the place name "Dashilanr" did not exist in the Ming dynasty. The so-called "Langfang" is often referred to as a storeroom along the street. Although the name "Dashilanr" was not used in the Ming dynasty, the place where Dashilanr situated was already a flourishing commercial district, with many merchants gathering.

In 1488, in order to secure the public safety of the capital, the central government built wooden fences at all the entrances to the streets and lanes in Beijing. The fence was accomplished with contributions from the local residents, and the total number of the fences was more than 1,700 by the end of the Qing dynasty. Among them, the Langfang Sitiao street's fence was funded by the merchants. For this reason, the fence was extremely large and thus got the name "Dashilanr". With the passage of time, "Dashilanr" gradually became the formal name of the street replacing "Langfang Sitiao".

In 1899, Dashilanr caught fire and the wooden fence was burnt. Since then, the fence has practically disappeared, leaving only the name "Dashilanr" itself. It was not until the year of 2000 that the Beijing government rebuilt an iron fence at the entrance of Dashilanr.

== Administrative Division ==
As of 2021, there are a total of 9 communities under the subdistrict:

Administrative Division Code	Community Name (English)	Community Name (Chinese)
110102013001	Qianmen Xiheyan	前门西河沿
110102013002	Yanshoujie	延寿街
110102013003	Sanjing	三井
110102013004	Dashilan Xijie	大栅栏西街
110102013005	Shitou	石头
110102013006	Tieshu Xiejie	铁树斜街
110102013007	Baishun	百顺
110102013008	Da'anlanying	大安澜营
110102013009	Meishijiedong	煤市街东

== Shops and stores ==
For centuries, the traditional commercial street Dashilanr has held quite a few China Time-honored Brands (Chinese: 老字号; pinyin: Lǎo zìhào) which are well-known in China. The China Time-honored Brands, such as Tongrentang (同仁堂; Tóngréntáng) Chinese herbal medicine store, Rui Fu Xiang (瑞蚨祥; ruìfúxiáng) silk store, Ma Ju Yuan (马聚元; Mǎjùyuán) hat store, Nei Lian Sheng (内联升; Neìliánshéng) shoe store, Zhang Yi Yuan (张一元; Zhāngyīyuán) tea shop, and Liu Bi Ju (六必居; Liùbìjū) pickle shop, as well as Yi Pin Zhai (一品斋; Yīpǐnzhāi), Bu Ying Zhai (步瀛斋; Bùyíngzhāi), Ju Shun He (聚顺和; Jùshùnhé), Chang Sheng Kui (长盛魁; Chángshèngkuí), are over 100 years old.

There once was a saying in Beijing, "Wear the hats of Ma Ju Yuan, stand in the shoes of Nei Lian Sheng, wear the clothes of Ba Da Xiang, and take the money of Si Da Heng Banks." Ma Ju Yuan, Nei Lian Sheng, Ba Da Xiang (八大祥; Bādàxiáng) and Si Da Heng (四大恒; Sìdàhéng) are all stores located in Dashilanr that are taken as the symbols of wealth.

Dashilanr was also the former entertainment center of Beijing apart from the commercial center. There were five grand Chinese opera theaters in Dashilanr: Qingle Yuan (庆乐园; Qìnglèyuán), Sanqing Yuan (三庆园; Sānqìngyuán), Guangde Lou (广德楼; Guǎngdélóu), Guanghe Yuan (广和园; Guǎnghéyuán), Tongle Yuan (同乐园; Tónglèyuán); the first movie theater in Beijing, Daguan Lou (大观楼; Dàguānlóu), also situated there. In former times there were many brothels and opium dens in the area.

== Education ==
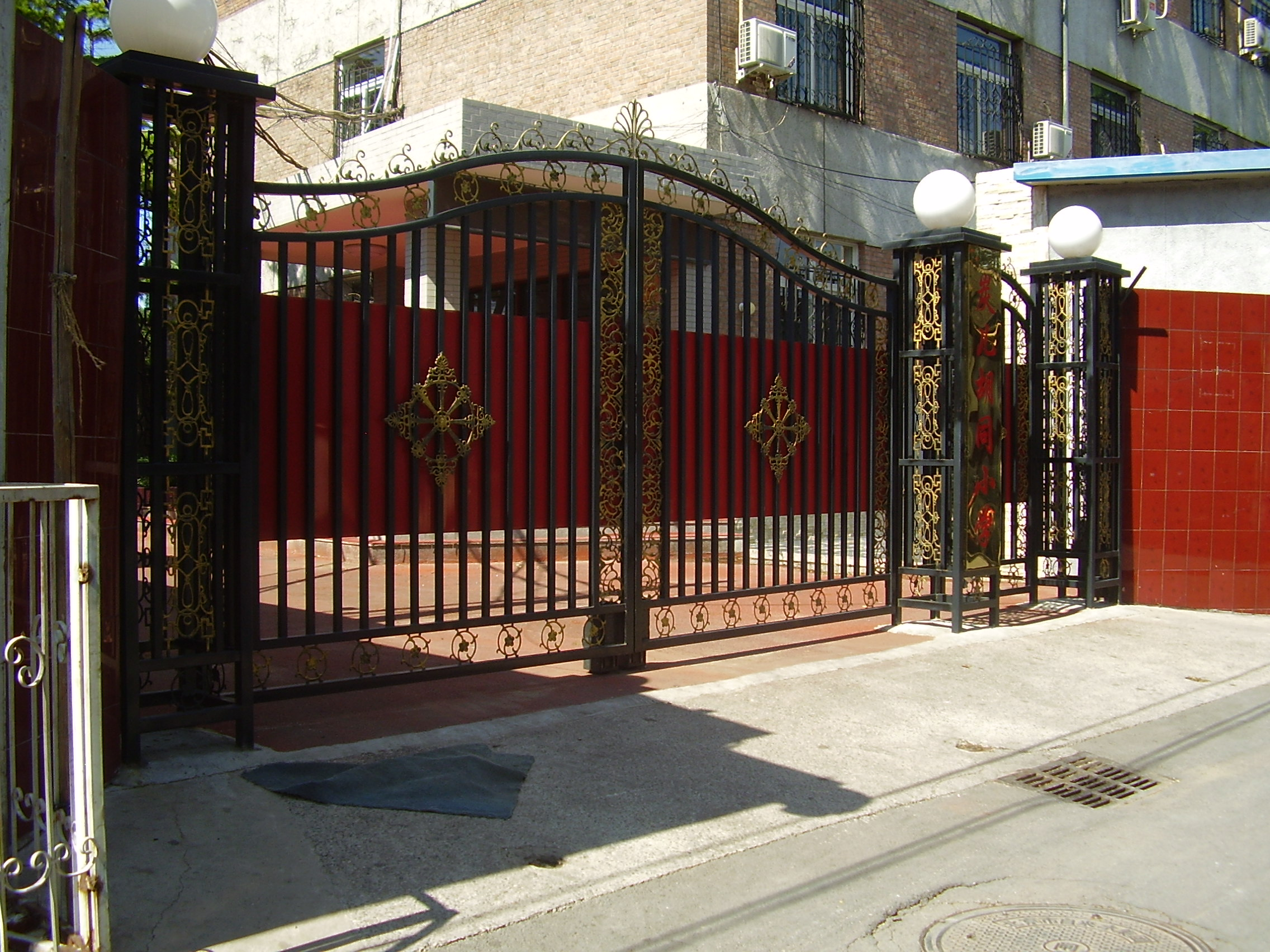
Tan'er Hutong (Coal Lane) Elementary School

One school in this area is Tan'er Hutong (Coal Lane) Elementary School (simplified Chinese: 炭儿胡同小学; traditional Chinese: 炭兒胡同小學; pinyin: Tàn'er Hútòng Xiǎoxué). According to Michael Meyer, the author of The Last Days of Old Beijing: Life in the Vanishing Backstreets of a City and a former teacher at Tan'er Hutong, the school had no gazetteer that recorded the history, the principal was not aware of the school history, and historical texts did not document the school's history; Meyer explained that "[i]t took months to assemble" his written history on the school and that he had gathered information by "talking to people in the lanes like Mr. Xie."

Meyer's account says that the school first opened in 1950. Meyer states that originally it was a private school named Solemn Honor Elementary School. Meyer explains that, in 1956 the school was renamed Religious Service Temple Elementary School, due to the school's proximity to a religious temple, and became a government-operated school. Meyer states that, during that year, the school's name changed to Demonstrate Strength School. According to Meyer, in 1957 the school moved to a new location and adopted the name West Canal Bank School; the name referred to the school's location, adjacent to a stream of water that travels along the city wall. Meyer's account states that the school adopted the new name Front Gate West Street Elementary and Middle School in 1974. According to Meyer, in 1981 the elementary division separated into its own school, and began classes in a campus along Tan'er Hutong.

During Meyer's period as a teacher, due to a widening project affecting Tan'er Hutong street, a different area elementary school was closed and demolished. Its employees and students were dispersed to various schools. Tan'er Hutong Elementary took two teachers and their students.

== Landmark ==
- Ji Xiaolan Residence
- Zhengyici Peking Opera Theatre

== See also ==
- List of township-level divisions of Beijing

== External links and further reading ==
- Meyer, Michael. The Last Days of Old Beijing: Life in the Vanishing Backstreets of a City. Bloomsbury Publishing USA, May 26, 2009. ISBN 0802717500, 9780802717504.
- Rawsthorn, Alice. "In China, Reviving an Ancient City and Its Craft Traditions." The New York Times. November 2, 2012.
