= Robert Fan =

Chinese architect

- Born: 1893; Shanghai
- Died: 1979 (aged 85–86)
- Other name: Fan Wenzhao
- Education: University of Pennsylvania; St John's University
- Occupation: Architect
- Buildings: Nanking Theater

Fan Wenzhao
- Traditional Chinese: 范文照
Transcriptions
Standard Mandarin
- Hanyu Pinyin: fàn wén zhào

Robert Fan Wenzhao (1893-1979) was an important figure among first-generation twentieth century Chinese architects, specifically for Shanghai’s architectural modernist movement in the 1930s.

== Biography ==
Born in Shanghai, Fan got a degree in engineering from St John's University in 1917. After working at St John's as engineering professor for two years, Fan pursued a Bachelor's degree in architecture from the University of Pennsylvania, graduating in 1922. There, he studied under Paul Philippe Cret, who had been trained in the Beaux-Arts style. Fan travelled extensively in Europe and America, acquiring a taste for modern, Western architectural styles, such as Art Deco.

Upon his return to Shanghai in 1922, Fan joined the Sino-American engineering venture Lam, Glines & Company (允元公司) of Von-Fong Lam [zh] (1891–1987). Three years later he opened one of the first Chinese architectural practices in Shanghai with fellow University of Pennsylvania alumnus Zhao Chen. Fan and Zhao designed the Nanking Theater in 1930 (now called the Shanghai Concert Hall), near People’s Square, before parting ways to start separate firms.

The following year, Fan also designed the Chinese YMCA (now the Marvel Hotel Shanghai), combining typical elements of Chinese architecture with Modern lines. He is also responsible for the Art Deco Majestic Theatre on Jiangning Lu in Jingan, built in 1941. Beyond his own firm, Fan worked with the government on several occasions. He served as a member of the Committee of the Nanjing City Planning Bureau in 1929, and was a technical consultant for the Ministry of Railways in Nanjing in 1932; where he was responsible for both the Railway and Health Ministries.

Eventually, Fan abandoned his Beaux-Arts training to embrace Modernist thinking. In 1933, he completed the Yafa Court apartment complex (253 – 267 Wuyuan Road). These apartments were advertised as having “modern sanitation, central heating, hot and cold water, Westinghouse refrigerators, and garages”. Fan also designed, in 1942, the Georgia Apartments on Hengshan Road in a late Art Deco style.

His also worked in Hong Kong on several buildings of the Chinese University's Chung Chi College (1956), Shek Kip Mei Police Station (1960), North Point Methodist Church (1961), Silver Capitol Cinema in Kwun Tong (1964), Hoover Theatre in Causeway Bay, Hong Kong Spinners Factory in Cheung Sha Wan and the Vitasoy Bottling Plant in Kwun Tong.

After the Communists took control of China in 1949, Fan fled with his wife to Hong Kong, at the age of 56.

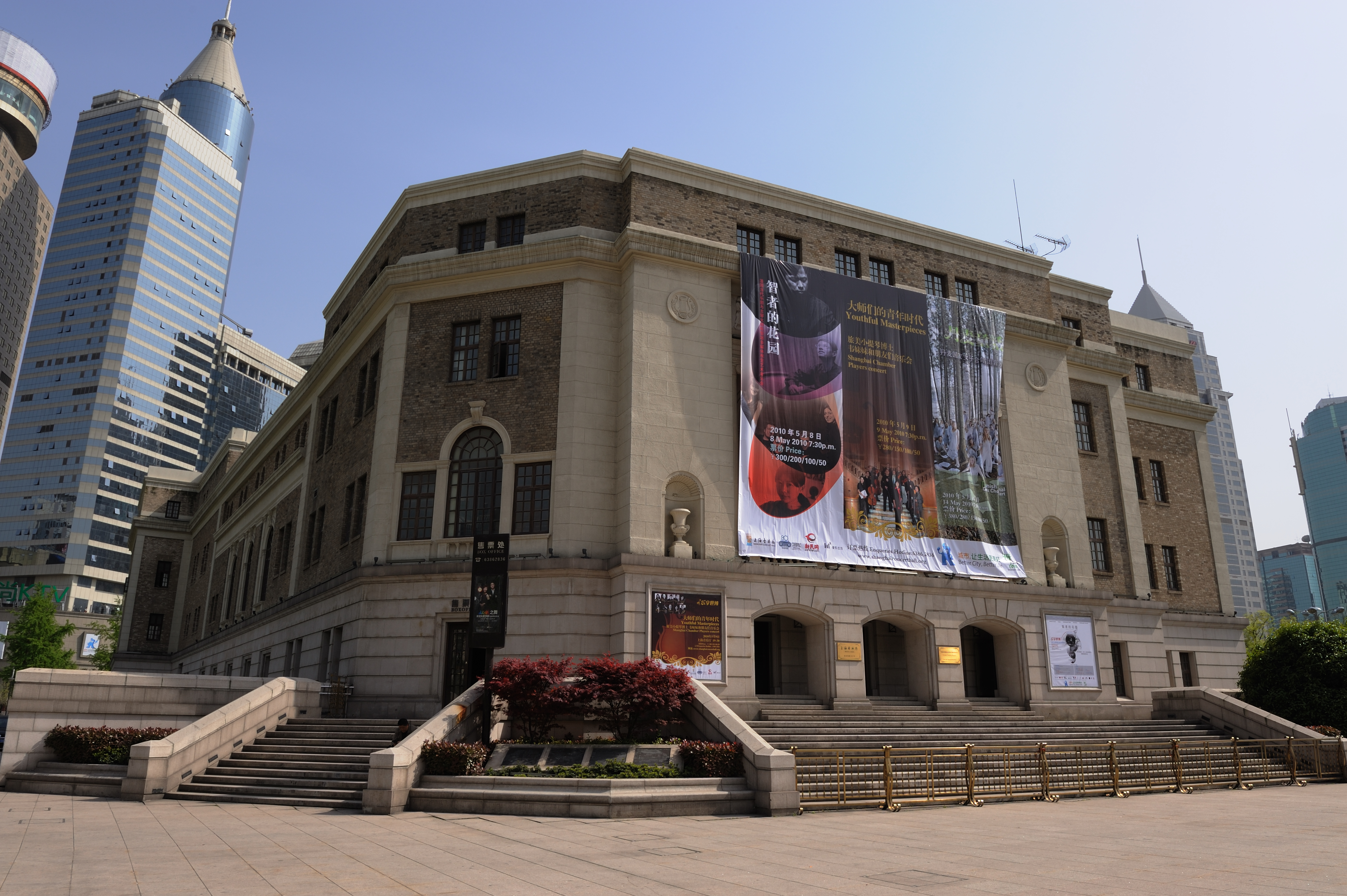
The Shanghai Concert Hall

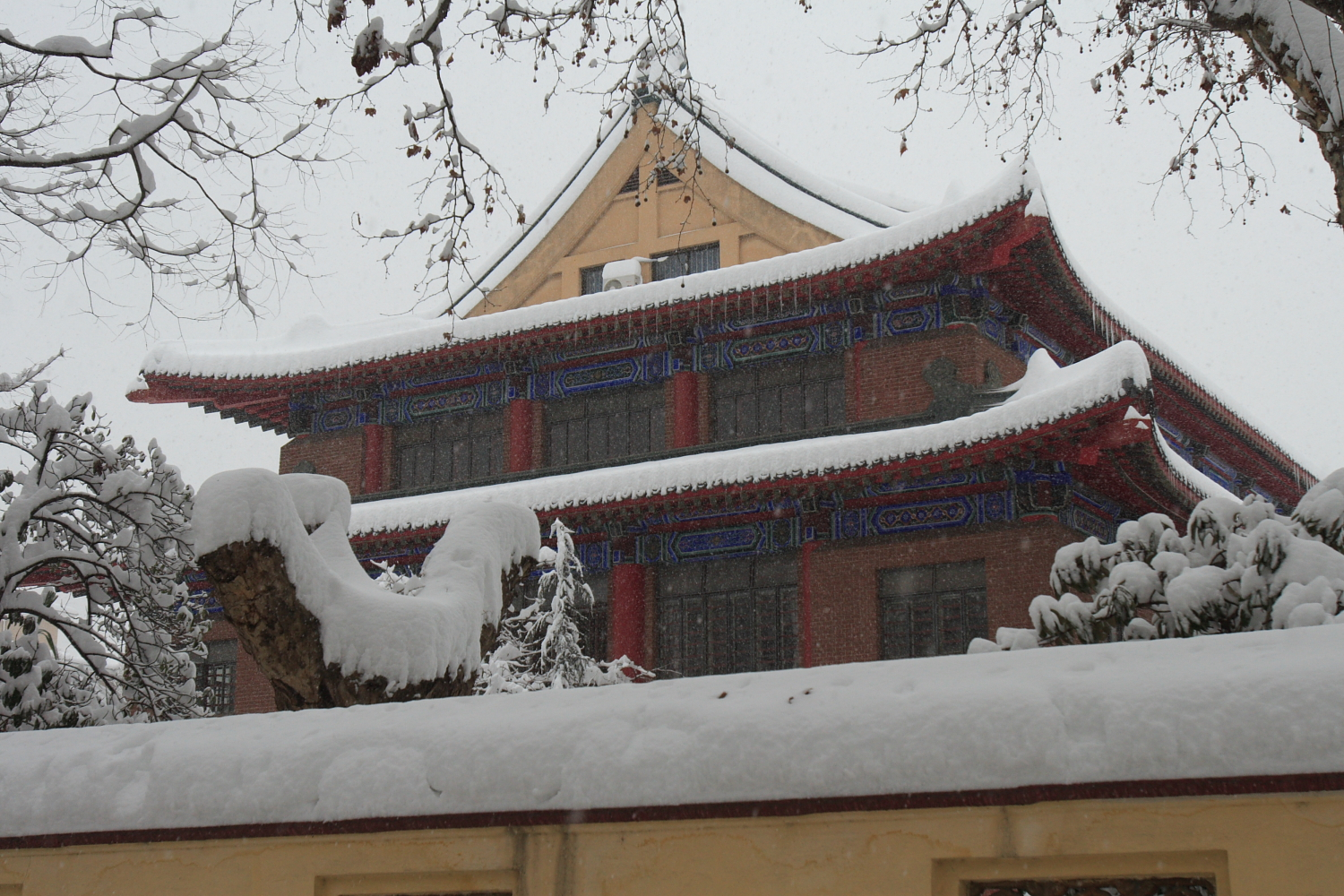
Nanjing Political College

== See also ==
- Liu Jipiao
- Poy Gum Lee
