= WA China Architecture Award =

Chinese architecture award

- Awarded for: Excellence in architectural design with Chinese contextual innovation
- Country: China
- Presented by: World Architecture Magazine
- First award: 2002 – present
- Website: https://www.wamp.com.cn/award

The WA China Architecture Award (WAACA) is a biennial architectural award established in 2002 by World Architecture Magazine. It aims to recognize built works in China that demonstrate innovative approaches aligned with local conditions while contributing to global architectural discourse. The award has gained recognition as one of China's most influential non-governmental architectural accolades and has increasingly shaped international perceptions of Chinese architectural practice.

== History ==
Founded by Professor Wang Lu, former editor-in-chief of World Architecture Magazine, the award initially focused on experimental design. In 2014, it underwent a major reform to expand its categories and emphasize diversified values, including social equity, technological innovation, and urban regeneration. Milestones include:

2002: Inaugural edition with a focus on experimental architecture.

2014: Introduction of six subcategories.

2023: Record-breaking 426 submissions evaluated by a jury chaired by academicians and renowned architects.

== Award categories ==
WAACA comprises six sub-awards:

- WA Achievement Award:

Recognizes projects demonstrating enduring spatial value (e.g., Wang Shu's Ningbo Museum).

- WA Design Experiment Award:

Celebrates pioneering design explorations, such as OPEN Architecture's "Chapel of Sound" (2021).

- WA Social Equality Award:

Honors projects advancing social equity, like the revitalization of Beijing's Yu'er Hutong community (2020).

- WA Technological Innovation Award:

Awards technical breakthroughs, exemplified by the modular construction of Shenzhen's Water Cube Talent Apartments (2018).

- WA City Regeneration Award:

Focuses on urban renewal, such as the transformation of Shanghai's Yangpu Riverside (2022).

- WA Housing Award:

Highlights innovative residential solutions, including co-living spaces in Guangzhou's Zini Community (2023).

== Selection criteria ==
- Eligibility: Built projects within specified timeframes (e.g., 2016–2018 for the 2020 cycle).
- Judging Process: Multi-stage review by panels chaired by academicians and featuring international jurors.
- Core Values: Emphasis on contextual relevance, technical rigor, and social impact.

== Notable recipients ==
| Year | Category | Project | Architect/Team | Location | Reference |
|---|---|---|---|---|---|
| 2018 | Achievement Award | Long Museum West Bund | Atelier Deshaus | Shanghai | |
| 2020 | Social Equality Award | Yu'er Hutong Micro-Regeneration | Tsinghua University Urban Renewal Team | Beijing | |
| 2023 | Technological Innovation | Xianghu Future School | China United Engineering Co. | Hangzhou | |

== International influence ==
WAACA has enhanced global recognition of Chinese architecture through:

- Cross-cultural juries: Inclusion of foreign architects and critics since 2015.
- Publications: Featured in World Architecture and academic journals like Architectural Journal.
- Case studies: Winning projects exhibited at international forums, such as the Venice Biennale (2023).

== Fee Structure ==
The WA China Architecture Award maintains the following entry fee schedule according to its 2023 official guidelines:

- Standard Categories (Design Experiment/Social Equality/Technological Innovation/City Regeneration/Housing): RMB 1,200 per project submission
- WA Achievement Award: RMB 1,600 per project submission
