= Yang Tingbao =

Chinese architect

- Born: 1901; Nanyang, Henan
- Died: 1982 (aged 80–81); Nanjing
- Education: Tsinghua University; University of Pennsylvania
- Occupation: Architect
- Buildings: Beijing Heping Hotel, Beijing Train Station, Tsinghua Library University Addition，Nanjing Central Stadium

Yang Tingbao (simplified Chinese: 杨廷宝; traditional Chinese: 楊廷寶; pinyin: Yáng Tíngbǎo; 1901–1982) was a Chinese architect and architectural educator known as one of "the Four Modern Masters in Architecture" in mainland China, along with Liang Sicheng, Tung Chuin, and Liu Dunzhen.

== Education ==
Born in Nanyang, Henan, China, Yang entered Tsinghua College in 1915 to study architecture.

== Career as an architect ==
Major projects directed by Yang involved Nanjing Central Stadium, the Tsinghua University Library Addition, Heping Hotel, Southeast University (China) campus amongst others. He also took part in the design of People's Grand Hall, Beijing Train Station and the Chairman Mao Memorial. He presided, participated, or directed over 100 projects in China, mainly in Nanjing and Beijing.

=== Republic of China era (1912–49) ===
In 1927, he returned to China and joined Jitai Architecture and Engineering as a design supervisor. He worked there until 1948. Between 1930 and 1931, Yang added the West and Middle side to the Tsinghua University Library, in which the East side was earlier designed by the American architect, Henry Murphy. The library was used as a wartime hospital during the Sino-Japanese War. In 1982, a second addition was designed by a professor Guan Zhaoye of Tsinghua University.

After the fourth National Athletic Games in Hangzhou in 1930, Republican President Chiang Kai-shek announced that a central stadium would be built in the capital Nanjing for the National Athletic Games in the future. In 1931, Yang Tingbao and his team won the competition for Nanjing Central Stadium and construction was completed in the same year.

In 1932, Yang took part in the Historical Building Renovation Project in Beijing, where he worked closely with local craftsmen in Beijing.

=== People's Republic of China 1949-1982 ===
In the early 1950s, Chinese architecture witnessed the growth of the "Large Roof Style Movement" (大屋顶运动; Dà wūdǐng yùndòng), which supporters claimed to align with Chinese tradition and to be expressive of the Chinese spirit. However, the leading critic of this movement, Liang Sicheng, ridiculed the style as: "Wearing the Western suit with a Manchurian hat."

Yang was indifferent to the fad and said: "I'm not against the Large Roof Style, but it's a waste of money. We designers shouldn't be slaves to fads and fashions." In 1952, he designed the Heping Hotel in Beijing, which was built to hold the Asia-Pacific Peace Conference. The Heping Hotel was then the first high-rise in Beijing at one story taller than Beijing Hotel. When it was built, the Heping Hotel's austere and modernistic look drew much controversy although it would later be seen as an exemplary work of public building design.

== Educational career ==
In 1940, Yang became a professor in the architecture department of Central University. In 1949, Central University was renamed National Nanjing University, and he became the chair of its architecture department. In 1952, the architecture department and other engineering departments at Nanjing's Southwestern University were reestablished as the Nanjing Institute of Technology, which in 1988 would be renamed Southeast University. Yang subsequently remained as architecture department chair at the newly established university.He remained the spiritual leader of the Nanjing School until his death in 1982.

== Political career ==
He served as vice president of the Chinese Architects Association four times, and president once. The Chinese Architects Association became affiliated with the International Union of Architects (IUA). Yang served as the vice president of the IUA between 1957 and 1963. From 1979 to 1982, he served as the vice governor of Jiangsu Province.

== Publications ==
Yang authored Comprehensive Hospital Architecture Design, Yang Tingbao Design Work, Yang Tingbao Watercolor, Yang Tingbao Drawing. He also wrote articles about urban planning and landscape design.

== Personal life ==
His son Yang Shi'e was an academician of the Chinese Academy of Engineering.
