= Xiaohu =

Xiaohu may refer to any of the following:

- Tai Xiaohu, male Chinese diver
- Tiger Huang (pinyin: Huáng Xiǎohǔ), Taiwanese singer
- Xiaohu Yu, Fellow Member of the IEEE
- Xiaohu FEV, electric city car

== See also ==
- Xiao Hu Dui, Taiwanese boy band
- Xiaohe (disambiguation)
