= Li Zhi (singer) =

Chinese singer-songwriter (born 1978)

Li Zhi 李志
- Also known as: BB; Bi Ge; Chen Xiao'er; Mr. Li, a Nanjing citizen
- Born: 13 November 1978 (age 48); Jintan County, Jiangsu, China
- Origin: Nanjing, Jiangsu, China
- Genres: Folk; rock
- Occupation: Singer-songwriter
- Instruments: Vocals; guitar
- Years active: 2004–present
- Labels: Koudai (2004–2006); Taihe Rye (2018–present); Panda Record (Japan)

Li Zhi (Chinese: 李志; pinyin: Lǐ Zhì; born 13 November 1978) (Note: GQ China reported in January 2019 that Li had turned 40 on 13 November 2018. Two court judgments issued in 2019 give his date of birth as 13 October 1978. In 1978 the 13th day of the tenth month of the Chinese lunar calendar fell on 13 November.) is a Chinese singer-songwriter who performs folk and rock music. He became one of the most commercially successful independent musicians in mainland China during the 2010s, building a large following without the backing of a record label. Born in rural Jintan County, Jiangsu, he dropped out of Southeast University in 1999 and spent several years playing in bars in Nanjing before recording his first albums at his own expense from 2004. His best-known albums include Mr. Van Gogh (2005), Has Man a Future (2006), In Love with Nanjing (2009) and 1701 (2014). Most of his songs draw on personal memory and on the cities he has lived in, Nanjing above all, though a number of them address social and political subjects.

Li ran his own team, sold recordings directly to listeners online, often on a pay what you want basis, and from 2010 held an annual New Year's Eve concert in Nanjing. In 2015 he became the first independent musician in mainland China to stage a large-scale arena tour with his own team, and in 2017 he launched the 334 Project, a plan to play in every one of the country's 334 prefecture-level divisions over about twelve years. He became known for confronting streaming services and television producers over the unlicensed use of his music, winning several copyright lawsuits, and for blunt public criticism of fellow musicians and of Chinese audiences.

In February 2019 the 23-show Sichuan leg of the 334 Project was cancelled, and that April Li's music and social media accounts disappeared from mainland Chinese platforms. The authorities gave no explanation specific to him, but several news organisations linked the removals to songs of his that refer to the 1989 Tiananmen Square protests and massacre, a subject that is heavily censored in China. Unable to perform publicly at home in the usual way, Li has since appeared with his band under the name Three Missing One (叁缺壹), playing a run of shows in Chengdu in 2020 and touring Japan in 2024 and Malaysia in 2025 and 2026.

== Early life ==
Li was born on 13 November 1978 in the countryside of Jintan County, in the southern part of Jiangsu province. As a boy he helped his family to plant and harvest rice; he later attended Jiangsu Hualuogeng High School in Jintan. Drawn to the sound of the guitar in junior high school, he practised on one borrowed from a relative, and in his second year of senior high school he saved up to buy his own.

In 1997 Li enrolled in the Department of Automatic Control at Southeast University, studying at its Pukou campus in Nanjing. The campus folk songs popular during his high-school years, gentle acoustic ballads about student life, had made him look forward to university, especially those of Lao Lang; but neither the campus nor his course lived up to his expectations. He often played and sang with a classmate, Wang Ke, and discovered the music of the Chinese rock musicians Zhang Chu and Cui Jian as well as Nirvana, Dire Straits and Pink Floyd. He has named the Taiwanese singer-songwriter Lo Ta-yu as the Chinese-language musician he most respects.

In the spring of 1998 a classmate introduced him to the novelist and essayist Wang Xiaobo's novella The Golden Age, and he began to frequent the Nanjing bookshop Librairie Avant-Garde in search of Wang's other books. He later said that Wang's writing, particularly the essay collection The Silent Majority, had shaped the way he thinks.

Li dropped out of Southeast University in the summer of 1999, before the end of his second year. He recalled that he had lost interest in his course, that his parents, teachers and friends could not talk him out of leaving, and that he had no clear plans. The same year he went to Beijing to try his luck in music, sleeping in a classmate's dormitory and auditioning at bars, but he could not adjust to the city's climate, traffic and way of life and soon returned to Nanjing. For the next several years he sold instruments, taught guitar and played in bars, while continuing to write songs.

In 2003, credited as "Chen Xiao'er" (陈小二), Li sang "Bar Narrative" (酒吧叙事体) with Xiao Chen on Yingqiu (影秋), an album of original songs by Nanjing University students. A retrospective on the university's alumni website later identified "Chen Xiao'er" as Li.

== Career ==
=== Independent musician (2004–2014) ===
In mid-2004 Li visited a university friend in Yinchuan, Ningxia, where he attended the Helan Mountain Rock Road music festival and toured the Western Xia mausoleums. Struck by how few visitors came to the tomb of the dynasty's founder, Li Yuanhao, he later recalled thinking: "the King of Western Xia, such a great king, and in the end all that's left is a mound of earth". The trip set him thinking about what he would leave behind, and he resolved to prove his existence through music.

Back in Nanjing, with friends' help, he chose several older songs and spent about a month and roughly ¥5,000 (about US$604 at the time) recording a demo, playing guitar and a little keyboard himself and programming the other parts on a computer. About 200 copies were burned to CD and sold on consignment in shops that dealt in cut-out records. Unhappy with the sound quality and unwilling to use his real name, he credited the recording to "BB", the origin of his nicknames "Bi Ge" (逼哥, "Brother B") and "Li Bi" (李逼), by which fans commonly call him. Koudai Records later released it as The Forbidden Game (被禁忌的游戏).

In 2005 Li recorded his second album, Mr. Van Gogh (梵高先生), for about ¥20,000; it too was released by Koudai. His third, Has Man a Future (这个世界会好吗, literally "Will This World Get Better?"), was launched in Nanjing on 18 November 2006 in a limited edition of 800 copies and did not turn a profit.

In 2007 Li moved to Chengdu to work as a telecommunications technician. He later said that he had wanted to get away from the Nanjing music scene for a while and to earn money to pay off his debts; in two years he saved about ¥200,000 (roughly US$28783). Between late 2008 and early 2009 he spent his weekends playing 15 solo acoustic shows billed as "Going Alone to the Meeting" (单刀赴会); the show at Yugong Yishan in Beijing on 11 January 2009 was released as the live album No One out on the Street (工体东路没有人).

Li returned to Nanjing in 2009 to concentrate on writing and performing, and spent about ¥300,000 (roughly US$43915) on his fourth album, In Love with Nanjing (我爱南京), released on 16 October. He regards it as his first proper solo album and as a break with the synthesisers and simple arrangements of his earlier work. It includes a cover of Zhang Weiwei's "Rice Shop" (米店) and "Marriage" (结婚), sung with Wan Xiaoli and Lao Lang. Sales fell short of expectations, and the production costs left him under financial pressure. The Nanjing launch show lost money, but Li saw it as the point at which he left bar-level performance behind; a recording was issued the following year on CD and DVD as The Incident of 16 October 2009. He then set out on the "Wild Beasts" (动物凶猛) acoustic tour, playing 34 shows across China in about 70 days.

In September 2010 Li released his fifth album, Hello Zhengzhou (你好，郑州). That year his team asked several online music platforms for a licensing fee of ¥5,000 (about US$739) a year; most refused and took his songs down, and Li joined other independent musicians in protesting against the streaming service Xiami Music's unauthorised sale of their work (see § Online music platforms). His friend Chi Bin then built him an official website offering recordings and concert videos on a pay what you want basis.

On 31 December 2010 Li held a New Year's concert, "We Love Nanjing Too", at the Jiangnan Theatre in Nanjing, with guests including Xiao He, Zhou Yunpeng, Wan Xiaoli, Ma Tiao and Su Yang; it was released the following year as a CD and DVD set.

In early 2011, after poor sales of his physical albums, Li took unsold stock to the countryside outside Nanjing and burned it, posting a video of the fire set to Chyi Chin's "Burn Away the Dreams" (把梦烧光). He and his team later said that the act reflected their disillusionment with conventional physical distribution, and they turned increasingly to digital releases.

In February 2011 Li had 100 copies printed of a book titled 你妈逼——一个现实主义者的理想世界 (Ni Ma Bi: A Realist's Ideal World; ni ma bi is a common Chinese obscenity), priced at ¥100 each. It was made to look like a commercially published book, but its imprint page named the fictitious "Lying, Posturing and Bullshitting Sanlian Hotel" as publisher, and its ISBN was not valid. Apart from a preface, "Why I Write", and a few lines at the beginning and end, its pages were filled almost entirely with the letter "X".

In September 2011, after a tour of Europe, Li released his sixth album, F, at first only as a pay-what-you-want download from his website; a physical edition followed in 2014. The experiment was meant to find a business model outside traditional record channels, but far fewer listeners paid than downloaded.

During his 2013 national tour Li launched the video series B-ge Night Talk (B哥夜话), in which he answered questions drawn at random from the audience at each show; each episode was released before the next stop. On 19 May that year he and his team left the Mengxiang Music Festival in Beijing without performing because the organisers had not paid the agreed fee. The festival's organiser, Cui Zhongpeng, had earlier helped Li's career, and Li's insistence on the terms of the contract prompted debate about whether contractual principle should outweigh personal obligation.

According to Li, he did not begin to make money from music until 2013; until then he had supported his team mainly with dividends from a software company in which he had invested and with help from friends. After the 2014 Chinese New Year Chi Bin formally became his manager. At the end of that year Li set up a company to run his music business, owned by its partners as shareholders; the team went full-time and built its own rehearsal space.

In November 2014 Li released his seventh studio album, 1701, which premiered exclusively on Xiami Music; the deal, brokered by Chi Bin, marked a reconciliation between Li and the platform. On 31 December he held the "i/O" New Year's concert at the Nanjing Sun Palace Theatre, streamed live in 4K in partnership with the video site LeTV.

=== Arena tours and expansion (2015–2018) ===
In April 2015 Li gave the Guangzhou weekly Southern Weekly his first in-depth interview after years of turning down the press. That year he launched the "Seen" (看见) tour, playing arenas and other large venues in Shenzhen, Xi'an, Shanghai, Wuhan, Chongqing and Beijing, with the producer Chen Weilun as music director. It opened at Shenzhen Gymnasium on 23 May with Su Yang as guest. The Paper described Li as the first independent musician in mainland China to mount a large-scale tour with his own team.

In June 2016 Oula Art Space (欧拉艺术空间), a live venue built by Li and several friends for about ¥5 million (roughly US$752502), opened at the Sun Palace performing arts plaza in Nanjing; the 500 tickets for its opening show on 22 June, with Lao Lang as guest, sold out. In August a recording of his unplugged show in Beijing on 29 May was released on the streaming service NetEase Cloud Music at ¥1 per album and, according to the news site Jiemian, sold more than 100,000 copies in six days. 8, made up mainly of covers of children's songs, followed in October. On 20 November Through Every Sad Street (在每一条伤心的应天大街上), named after Yingtian Street in Nanjing, where his rehearsal room is located, premiered exclusively on NetEase Cloud Music at ¥20 per copy and sold more than 50,000 copies in 48 hours.

Earlier, on 1 May 2016, Li had published a long post on Weibo, China's dominant Twitter-like microblogging platform, titled "Knowing the Mandate of Heaven" (知天命, a phrase from the Analects of Confucius), proposing to play one show in each of China's 334 prefecture-level divisions. He formally announced the 334 Project in a live video stream on 19 February 2017, expecting it to take about 12 years. The first leg took place in Anhui. Chi Bin told Southern Metropolis Daily that the project aimed to bring live music to cities that independent acts rarely visited, and that the team would document it in the series Our 334.

On 31 December 2017 Li held his ninth New Year's concert, "Believe in the Future" (相信未来), at the Nanjing Olympic Sports Center, with Zheng Jun as guest. The roughly four-hour show included unplugged, jazz and orchestral segments, and was the first at which he rearranged earlier songs with jazz elements. Six jazz and six unplugged recordings from it were released on NetEase Cloud Music on 16 April 2018 as the digital album Li Zhi Jazz and Unplugged 12 Songs, which by 19 April had sold more than 55,000 copies and grossed over ¥1 million (about US$151149).

In 2018 Li's songs were performed without authorisation on the online talent show The Coming One, produced by Wajijiwa Entertainment and Tencent, and on its concert tour. He objected publicly and sued the show's producers and the tour's organisers, and was awarded damages in both cases in 2019 (see § The Coming One).

On 23 October 2018 the Beijing-based Taihe Music Group announced a partnership between Li's team and its label Taihe Rye Music (Maitian), then headed by Lao Lang. According to the group, the two sides would cooperate on distribution, industry resources and team operations, while Li's team would retain its creative and operational independence.

=== Tour cancellation and removal from platforms (2019) ===
Under the 334 Project, Li was due to play 23 shows in 21 prefecture-level divisions of Sichuan between 23 February and 20 April 2019. On 22 February he posted on Weibo a photograph of himself wearing a hospital wristband, captioned "Sorry", and announced that the whole tour was cancelled. His team said that the cancellation was for health reasons and that tickets would be refunded, an account the organisers confirmed to Red Star News.

On 3 April the Sichuan Provincial Department of Culture and Tourism announced that in February it had urgently halted a 23-show solo tour of the province by a well-known vocal performer who had "behaved improperly", and had overseen refunds of more than 18,000 tickets; it neither named the performer nor described the misconduct. Because the number of shows matched, there was public speculation that the performer was Li, as The Paper reported. The next day Li's representatives denied this to Beijing Youth Daily, saying that the tour had been cancelled because he had been in hospital for surgery. The same day the provincial cultural market law enforcement bureau said that the tour had been halted under the Regulations on the Administration of Commercial Performances, but that the announcement "did not specifically point to anyone" and people should not jump to conclusions; it too did not identify the performer.

On 12 April Li's accounts and music became inaccessible on several mainland Chinese platforms. According to the Shanghai news site Qdaily and Taiwan's Central News Agency (CNA), his Weibo account and his account "Nanjing Li Zhi" on the messaging app WeChat could no longer be found, and his pages on the streaming services QQ Music, Xiami Music and NetEase Cloud Music and on the review site Douban had been deleted or taken down; some accounts were reported to have been suspended after complaints of violations.

No authority offered an explanation specific to Li for the cancellation, the suspensions or the removal of his music. Some media linked them to earlier songs such as "The Square" (广场), "Spring of 1990" (1990年的春天) and "The People Don't Need Freedom" (人民不需要自由), which touch on the 1989 Tiananmen Square protests and other political and historical subjects. Public discussion of the protests and of their violent suppression on 4 June 1989 is tightly restricted in mainland China, and several outlets noted that the removals came in the weeks before the 30th anniversary. On 21 April China Digital Times, a website based in the United States that documents Chinese censorship, published what it said was a directive from mainland internet regulators ordering the removal of audio and video related to five of his songs: "The People Don't Need Freedom", "They" (他们), "Goddess" (女神), "The Square" and "Spring of 1990". The Associated Press (AP) later cited the document, while saying that it could not independently verify it.

On 2 May the winners of the 10th China Rock Midi Awards were announced. The announcement avoided Li's name, listing the Best Male Rock Singer as "Mr. Li, a Nanjing citizen" (南京市民李先生), while the screen at the ceremony showed his picture. The Weibo posts about the award were later deleted, and the earlier list of nominees naming Li could no longer be viewed.

Li's fan forum on Baidu Tieba, a large Chinese discussion platform, was later closed as well. The AP reported in June that some fans were still circulating his music and concert videos on video and file-sharing sites, and setting up back-up download links in case the content was deleted.

=== Three Missing One (2020–2023) ===
Since April 2019 Li has been unable to perform publicly in mainland China in the usual way, and his band has mostly appeared as Three Missing One (叁缺壹). The name literally describes a line-up in which the band's three backing vocalists, Zhu Gele, A Maini and Zhang Yiran, are present and Li is absent; it has since become the name under which his team announces performances.

On 24 February 2020 Li posted a photograph of himself from behind on the 334 Project's Weibo account, captioned "Love everybody with respect". It was his first public post since April 2019.

On 21 July 2020 the ticketing platform Showstart announced a run of Three Missing One shows on 8–13 August at Hall 1 of the Zhenghuo Art Centre in Chengdu. The bill was headed by Zhu Gele, A Maini and Zhang Yiran, with other players drawn mainly from Li's touring band; tickets cost ¥300. Li was not on the bill at the venue, which had been booked for the cancelled Sichuan tour, but the poster was designed as mahjong tiles, a nod to the everyday sense of san que yi, a mahjong table with only three of its four players, and included a cartoon figure based on him, and fans took the name as a reference to his inability to perform publicly. When the run opened on 8 August, Li performed with the band. According to Music Xiansheng, fans without tickets gathered outside the venue to sing along, and Li sang "Ostrich" (鸵鸟) at the second show; the report added that the shows did not mean the 334 Project had resumed.

In August 2020 Li was also announced for the Donghai Music Festival in Zhoushan, Zhejiang, on 4–6 September, but on 29 August the organisers postponed the festival, citing a typhoon, and later rescheduled it for 16–18 October, so Li did not play on the original dates.

Under licence from Taihe Music Group, the Japanese label Panda Record released Best Selection Songs 2004–2018, a three-volume compilation series sold only in Japan, between 2019 and 2021. Each volume is a double album pairing studio versions on one disc with live versions of the same songs on the other. The first volume appeared on CD and vinyl in April 2019; the second, Ballads, on 27 May 2020 as part of Tower Records Japan's "China Now" campaign; and the third, Reflection, as a limited double LP sold first at Tower Records on 12 November 2021, followed by a double CD on 24 December.

In 2022, 1701 Music Park (壹柒零壹音乐公园), a cluster of music venues co-founded by Li, opened in the Chuqiao City complex on Andemen Street in Nanjing's Yuhuatai District. Operated by Nanjing 1701 Culture and Technology Co., Ltd., it covers more than 4,000 m^{2} (43,000 sq ft) and combines live venues, an instrument shop, a record shop and bars. Its main performance spaces are 1701 Live House Max, a hall of over 1,000 m^{2} (11,000 sq ft) on the second floor, and the small-to-medium 1701 Live House on the first. The park also includes 1701 Mini Bar (later renamed 1701 Open Space) and, outside the complex, 1701 Music Bar, a café and restaurant by day that hosts resident bands at night.

=== Overseas tours (2024–present) ===
In April and May 2024 Li and his band played the five-date Three Missing One Japan Tour 2024, organised by Panda Record: Dojima River Forum in Osaka (20 April), Diamond Hall in Nagoya (23 April), United Lab in Fukuoka (27 April), Sendai Gigs in Sendai (29 April) and Garden Theater in Tokyo (2 May). A recording of the Tokyo show was released in Japan by Panda Record on 13 June 2025 as a double CD and a limited triple LP.

From 11 to 13 November 2025 Li played three shows, billed as "Three Missing One 2025 Tour – Kuala Lumpur", at Idea Live Arena in the 3 Damansara shopping centre in Petaling Jaya, Selangor, Malaysia. The band's line-up was changed for the shows, and some songs were rearranged. A live album of selected recordings was released through record retailers in Taiwan on 16 October 2026, followed on 30 October by a concert film on 4K Ultra HD Blu-ray, with 26 songs and behind-the-scenes footage of rehearsals and stage construction. Li returned to the same venue for three more shows from 13 to 15 November 2026.

== Artistry ==
=== Themes and lyrics ===
Li's songs draw mostly on his personal life, relationships and memories of cities, and often use place names to mark stages of his life, as in "Memories of Zhengzhou" (关于郑州的记忆), "Hangzhou" (杭州), "Summer on Shanyin Road" (山阴路的夏天), "Dingxi" (定西) and "Rehe" (热河). Nanjing, where he has lived since 1997, is central to his work: it gives its name to his fourth album, and Through Every Sad Street is named after the street where he rehearses. He held New Year's concerts in the city for many years, and the 2019 Midi Awards referred to him as "Mr. Li, a Nanjing citizen". Jiemian wrote that his songs carry a sense of dissolute, disoriented youth that resonates with young bohemians.

Li's early lyrics and stage manner were blunt and coarse, with frequent profanity. The critic A Shui wrote that many of his love songs deal with heartbreak, setting lyrical lines beside everyday images such as steamed-bun shops and office workers to create a serious, authentic texture, and that by 1701 his lyrics had become more refined and obscure and the profanity had largely gone.

Some of Li's songs address social and political subjects. Media including the CNA and Radio Free Asia have linked "The Square", "Spring of 1990" and "Goddess" to the 1989 Tiananmen Square protests, and have read "The People Don't Need Freedom" and "Dusk" (黄昏) as satires of authoritarian rule. Other songs treat political figures and ideologies playfully: "They" swaps the honorifics of Sun Yat-sen, founder of the Republic of China, and Mao Zedong, founder of the People's Republic, and pokes fun at the former Taiwanese president Chen Shui-bian, while the 2012 live version of "Youth" (青春) poses rhetorical questions about socialism, the official ideology of the People's Republic, and the Three Principles of the People, the political philosophy of Sun's Nationalist Party. At his 2016–17 New Year's concert he performed "The Square" and recited the poet Bei Dao's "The Answer" (回答), a defiant poem from the 1970s. Li has said that he considers it his responsibility to discuss social realities in his music and on social media, and that he hopes listeners will share the values his work conveys.

=== Arrangement and performance ===
Li's first three albums were lo-fi recordings on which most parts other than guitar and some keyboards were programmed on a computer. A Shui described his early guitar strumming as rough and forceful and his singing as often short of breath. From In Love with Nanjing onwards Li worked with professional musicians, gradually settling on an electric band of two guitars, bass, keyboards, drums, percussion, harmonica and backing vocals.

Li led the arrangements on 1701 and has said that the opening of "The Rat Says" (鼠说) borrows from the English guitarist Jeff Beck. He has also spoken of his love of Pink Floyd: when critics pointed out the resemblance between his 2013 rearrangement of "The Forbidden Game" and "Shine On You Crazy Diamond", he replied that imitation is a form of worship. According to Jiemian, most of his songs exist in three or four arrangements, which the band keeps revising in rehearsal.

He has often tried out new arrangements at his New Year's concerts. At the 2016–17 "Home" (家) concert he combined his electric band with the Jin Haiyin Orchestra, a performance released as Li Zhi Band and Orchestra; at "Believe in the Future" a year later he reworked earlier songs in jazz and unplugged settings, released as Li Zhi Jazz and Unplugged 12 Songs. The album 8 consists mainly of rearranged children's songs, and several songs were rearranged again for the 2025 Kuala Lumpur shows.

=== Band ===
Li's concerts centre on his own songs and vocals, backed by professional musicians, most of them based in Nanjing, in a line-up that changes with the needs of each show. Around 2009 he began hiring professional players and introduced management practices he had encountered while working in Chengdu, which at first caused discontent among the musicians. The team later put its musicians on full-time contracts; the band rehearsed more than 200 days a year under a clocking-in system, with rehearsal pay docked for lateness. After the 2015 "Seen" tour the team worked more closely with professional production staff, employing a music director, sound engineers and stage crew for arena shows.

At the launch show for In Love with Nanjing on 16 October 2009, Li (lead vocals, guitar) was backed by Wang Chun and Ji Songhao (guitar), Zhang Wen (bass), Hu Xin (keyboards, samples), Yu Ganning (drums, backing vocals), Wang Aishu and Zheng Ying (backing vocals) and Tao Jing (guest keyboards), with guest appearances by Lao Lang, Wan Xiaoli and Tang Chen. The principal session musicians on Hello Zhengzhou included Han Jun (guitar), Li Jiujun (bass), Hu Xin and Liu Wei (keyboards), Yu Ganning (drums), Zhang Jian (piano), Soichiro Arai (percussion), Wen Zhiyong (trumpet), Zhang Shasha (cello) and Zhang Weiwei (clarinet, accordion), with backing vocals by Su Yang, Lao Lang, Shao Yibei and Zhang Shasha.

According to the credits of Li Zhi Band and Orchestra, the band at the 2016–17 New Year's concert comprised Yuan Zheng and Zhao Yongqing (guitar), Zhang Wen (bass), Li Tianxiong (keyboards), Yu Ganning (drums), Wei Xing (percussion), Chen Qian (harmonica) and Zhu Gele, A Maini, Zhang Yiran and Da Hong (backing vocals), joined by the Jin Haiyin Orchestra. Chen Shuaiwen stood in for Wei Xing on percussion for most of the Shandong leg of the 334 Project, from 14 July to 25 August 2018. On the 2024 Japan tour, according to Panda Record, the band was Zhao Yongqing and Zhou Liang (guitar), Zhang Wen (bass), Li Tianxiong (keyboards), Wei Xing (drums), Chen Shuaiwen (percussion), Chen Qian (harmonica) and A Maini, Zhu Gele and Zhang Yiran (backing vocals).

== Copyright disputes ==
=== Online music platforms ===
In 2010 Li's team asked eight or nine online music platforms to pay a licensing fee of ¥5,000 a year; most declined and removed his music. That September he joined Xiao He, Wan Xiaoli, Zhou Yunpeng and other musicians in an open letter demanding that Xiami Music stop selling unauthorised downloads of their work. The letter prompted debate about copyright protection for independent musicians, though some accused Li of using the campaign for publicity. The two sides were reconciled when 1701 premiered on Xiami in 2014.

In 2015 Li sued the streaming service Kugou for copyright infringement. After about two years he won ¥28,705 (about US$4247) in damages and an apology, but legal costs left him ¥1,616 out of pocket.

=== The Coming One ===
In 2018 the singer Mao Buyi performed Li's "Memories of Zhengzhou" on the concert tour of The Coming One, and the contestant Qiu Hongkai sang his "Castle in the Sky" (天空之城) on the programme itself; neither performance had been licensed. Li demanded a total of ¥3 million (about US$453446) from the show's producers and the tour's organisers, while saying that the singers themselves should not be held responsible. When negotiations failed, he announced in July that he would sue. Wajijiwa Entertainment, one of the producers, said that it had apologised and was willing to take responsibility, but considered the sum excessive.

In January 2019 the Nanshan District People's Court in Shenzhen found that the producers had infringed Li's performance right (the right to control public performance of a work) and his right of communication through information networks (the Chinese counterpart of the right to make a work available online), and ordered Wajijiwa and two Tencent subsidiaries jointly to pay ¥200,000 (about US$28950) in damages and ¥55,380 in reasonable expenses. It rejected his claims that his rights to adapt the works for film and to compile them had been infringed, as well as his demand for an apology; Li said that he would not appeal.

The second case, concerning the tour's stop in Luoyang, was heard in February at the Xiaoshan District People's Court in Hangzhou, where Li sought ¥2 million (about US$289503) plus ¥108,580 in expenses from three organisers; the defendants said that they had already apologised and that the claim was excessive. In May the court found at first instance that the three had infringed Li's performance right and ordered them to pay ¥100,000 in total, including expenses. It held that Mao's remark on stage that the song was "teacher Li Zhi's" (laoshi, "teacher", is a common term of respect in Chinese) sufficiently identified the author, so that the right of attribution had not been infringed, and it declined to order a public apology because the case concerned only economic rights and the singer and organisers had already apologised several times.

== Public image ==
=== Commentary on peers and audiences ===
After joining Weibo, Li often criticised fellow musicians for lacking respect for their work, said that Chinese audiences had low standards of musical appreciation, and argued against singers pandering to fans.

In 2015 he wrote on Weibo that the songs of the folk duo Haomeimei were not good, though their hard work was worth learning from, and went on to disparage some songs by the folk singer Ma Di. According to the entertainment commentary site Yule Yingtang, the dispute began when Ma lamented on Weibo how sad it was to make music in China; Li countered that Chinese audiences were generally undiscerning and singers did not find it hard to make money, and that to make music in China was in fact good fortune. The two argued back and forth online, and Li drew criticism from many internet users and from fans of both artists. After Ma answered him point by point, Li said that young people ought to have some fire in them, and the two made peace. Yule Yingtang wrote that Li had also publicly criticised Zuoxiao Zuzhou and other musicians.

The Paper wrote that onlookers were broadly split between those who thought Li had gone too far and those who, whatever they thought of him, felt that the issues he raised deserved discussion. Li said in an interview that calling a song bad was purely a matter of taste, that his target was not any singer or their fans but listeners who lacked judgement, and that he would go on criticising.

=== Ticket pricing ===
Li has long advocated low ticket prices and opposed touting and complimentary tickets. When the 2015 "Seen" tour adopted tiered prices from ¥180 to ¥880 (roughly US$29 to US$141), some commentators accused him of inconsistency. He responded that "fairness doesn't mean everyone eating from the same pot" (a Chinese idiom for equal shares regardless of contribution), that prices depended on costs, risk and financial capacity, and that what he opposed was the unfairness created by touts reselling at inflated prices. When the cheapest tickets for the 2016 New Year's concert cost twice as much as in previous years, his team investigated bulk buying by bots.

=== Online posts ===
Around 2008 Li posted an "Autobiography of Li Zhi" to a Douban group. Written in coarse language, and with a warning in its title that it was not for the squeamish, it described his romantic and sexual relationships in detail and referred to several women by their initials. In a 2016 interview with Jiemian, Li said that the piece had caused trouble for others involved and that he regretted it, but that he should not deny his own experiences for the sake of his public image.

In October 2016, after the folk singer Song Dongye was detained for using cannabis, Li wrote on Weibo that most of the people then asking him questions seemed curious rather than concerned, and that prying into other people's private lives was dull. He went on to say that in nearly twenty years he had "flown" (slang for getting high) three or four times, most recently six years earlier, and that he abstained not out of fear but because he took no pleasure in it. When a user joked that he had better run, he replied that it had happened years ago in the Netherlands, where the use of cannabis is tolerated. The post, made on 17 October, was soon deleted, and several outlets reported that Li had said he had used cannabis. In a later post he wrote that a person should neither be praised to the skies for one good deed nor wholly condemned for one mistake, which some media read as a possible defence of Song. Asked what he thought of celebrities using cannabis, he replied that its greatest harm was that many users moved on to other drugs.

In April 2021 the drummer of the Nanjing indie band Schoolgirl byebye wrote on Weibo that her father had helped to alter her university grades and had arranged jobs for her and her husband, prompting controversy over the use of family connections; the Nanjing Commission for Discipline Inspection said that it had received complaints and was looking into the matter. On 4 April Li posted a series of comments on his Weibo account (formerly the 334 Project's), emphasising the value of musical talent, calling for tolerance towards people who make mistakes, and opposing excessive online punishment of individuals. Some fans criticised him for defending a beneficiary of privilege, which they saw as contradicting his past criticism of social injustice. A commentary in Music Xiansheng called his stance elitist and condescending (diewei, or "dad flavour", in Chinese internet slang), and said that it ignored ordinary people's anger at unequal opportunity and had led fans to question whether his values had changed.

== Reception ==
=== Critical reception ===
A 2015 profile in The Paper said that Li had exceptional box-office appeal among independent musicians, but that commercial success did not mean his artistic achievement surpassed that of his peers. Li has described his own musical talent as ordinary and attributed his popularity to timing, hard work and luck.

The Taiwanese music critic and broadcaster Ma Shih-fang wrote that Li's work is deeply affecting because it blends personal and social experience, echoing the struggles and disillusionment of educated young people who left home in a time of social change. Reviewing 1701, A Shui, who described himself as no fan, felt that Li's songs had not broken out of the conventions of Chinese folk and were not necessarily better than other folk singers', but acknowledged that they had accompanied many people through their youth; he thought Li's shift from fighting streaming platforms over copyright to managing his team and planning tours no bad thing. A 2018 article in Yule Yingtang called Li "the Lu Xun of the music scene", likening him to the early 20th-century writer famous for his biting social criticism, and described him as an angry poet who never lost his edge in defending his rights and criticising the industry; it also cited an internet saying that likens Li and his fellow folk singers Song Dongye and Zhao Lei to reality, dreams and ideals respectively.

After Li's music was removed in 2019, the commentator Yang Shiyang described him as an outlier in his scene and his era: a man who valued rules and contracts, and who had repeatedly gone to court over copyright rather than settle matters through personal connections. Yang wrote that Li's music, his statements and his insistence on his rights all showed a defiance that formed part of the background to what had happened to him. The AP presented his case as representative of the cancelled performances and removed works that accompanied tightening cultural censorship in mainland China.

=== Among musicians ===
Lao Lang has spoken of a mutual appreciation between himself and Li, who calls Lao Lang a mentor and friend. At a concert in Nanjing in mid-2015, the rock singer Wang Feng introduced Li, who was sitting in the front row, to the audience and praised him for bringing glory to Nanjing rock. In February 2019 the singer Han Hong, sharing "Has Man a Future" and "Be With You" (和你在一起) on NetEase Cloud Music, said that Li's songs made her cry and that with them she "almost forgot all vocal technique", because none was needed. LEE, a Nanjing heavy-metal musician and radio presenter, called Li an iconic figure in the city's cultural scene whose drive and self-discipline were hard to match, but said that his image as a socially responsible public voice was to some extent also commercial positioning.

Chi Bin, his manager and business partner, has said that Li's strength is his willingness to listen to dissent: when Chi told him bluntly that 8 was not a good album, Li agreed. Li has said that he needs someone around him who disagrees with him.

=== Awards and nominations ===
Awards and nominations received by Li Zhi
Year	Award	Category	Nominee	Result	Ref.
2015	4th Abilu Music Awards	Folk Album of the Year	1701	Nominated	
2019	10th China Rock Midi Awards	Best Male Rock Singer	Li Zhi (announced as "Mr. Li, a Nanjing citizen")	Won	

== Personal life ==
Li married Ren Shuai on 13 September 2013. Their daughter was born in 2014.

== Discography ==
=== Studio albums ===
Studio albums by Li Zhi
Title	Released	Tracks	Notes
The Forbidden Game 被禁忌的游戏	1 December 2005	9	Recorded in Nanjing in 2004 for about ¥5,000 and first sold as about 200 burned CDs credited to "BB"; later released by Koudai Records.
Mr. Van Gogh 梵高先生	25 December 2005	9	Recorded in 2005 for about ¥20,000; released by Koudai Records.
Has Man a Future 这个世界会好吗	18 November 2006 (Nanjing launch)	10	Limited to 800 copies; packaged with a booklet, poster, notebook and About B&B, a collection of essays and poems.
In Love with Nanjing 我爱南京	16 October 2009	9+7	Double CD; cost about ¥300,000 to make.
Hello Zhengzhou 你好，郑州	1 September 2010	10	Includes "Memories of Zhengzhou" and "Sunflower on the Wall".
F	28 September 2011 (digital); 22 May 2014 (physical)	9	Initially a pay-what-you-want download from Li's website.
1701	13 November 2014 (digital)	8	Premiered exclusively on Xiami Music.
8	18 October 2016	9	Mainly rearranged covers of children's songs; initially free to stream and download.
Through Every Sad Street 在每一条伤心的应天大街上	20 November 2016	8	Premiered exclusively on NetEase Cloud Music at ¥20 per copy; sold more than 50,000 copies in 48 hours.

=== Live albums ===
Live albums by Li Zhi
Title	Released	Tracks	Notes
Bring In the Wine 将进酒	11 November 2007	16	Recordings from the "Bring In the Wine" concert at Star Live, Beijing (30 April 2007), the 2007 Midi Music Festival and radio interviews.
No One out on the Street 工体东路没有人	22 January 2009	16	Recorded at the "Going Alone to the Meeting" solo acoustic show at Yugong Yishan, Beijing, on 11 January 2009.
The Incident of 16 October 2009 二零零九年十月十六日事件	30 January 2010	12+14	Recorded at the Nanjing launch of In Love with Nanjing; a small run of double CDs and double DVDs was given away.
We Love Nanjing Too 我们也爱南京	18 September 2011	11+6+13+10	Recorded at the 2010–11 New Year's concert; published by the Tang Chen Art Fund as a wooden-boxed set of four CDs and four DVDs with postcards and a leaflet.
Imagine	2012	10+14	Recorded at the 2011–12 New Year's concert; double CD and double DVD.
108 Keywords 108个关键词	2013	7+9	Recorded at the 2012–13 New Year's concert in Nanjing; self-released double CD.
Three and Four 勾三搭四	1 April 2014	11+10	Recorded at the 2013–14 New Year's concert; double CD.
i/O	21 January 2015	11	Recorded at the 2014–15 New Year's concert; digital release.
Seen 看见	27 June 2015	10	Recorded mainly at the Beijing show of the "Seen" tour; "Mr. Van Gogh" is a studio version.
Square 动静	14 March 2016	11	Recorded at the 2015–16 New Year's concert.
Li Zhi Unplugged Live in Beijing 李志北京不插电现场	11 August 2016	12	Recorded at Li's show in the Jiangzao IV concert series in Beijing on 29 May 2016; sold on NetEase Cloud Music for ¥1, with more than 100,000 copies sold in six days.
Li Zhi Band and Orchestra 李志、电声与管弦乐	16 May 2017	12	Recorded at the 2016–17 "Home" New Year's concert with the Jin Haiyin Orchestra.
Li Zhi Jazz and Unplugged 12 Songs 爵士乐与不插电新编12首	16 April 2018	12	Recorded at the 2017–18 "Believe in the Future" New Year's concert; earlier songs rearranged in jazz and unplugged settings.
Li Zhi Band and Orchestra II 李志、电声与管弦乐Ⅱ	16 May 2018	9	Recorded at the 2017–18 New Year's concert, again with the Jin Haiyin Orchestra.
Three Missing One Japan Tour 2024 in Tokyo	13 June 2025	8+6 (double CD); 6+4+4 (triple LP)	Recorded at the Tokyo show of the 2024 Japan tour on 2 May 2024; released in Japan by Panda Record.
Three Missing One 2025 Tour – Kuala Lumpur: Live Recordings 2025叁缺壹巡演吉隆坡站 现场录音专辑	16 October 2026	9 (Note: The album has nine tracks; the first is a medley of "Intro", "Black Envelope" (黑色信封) and "Dingxi", so release descriptions give the total as 11 songs.)	Selected recordings from the November 2025 Kuala Lumpur shows; single CD.

=== Compilation albums ===
Compilation albums by Li Zhi, released in Japan by Panda Record
Title	Released	Tracks	Notes
Best Selection Songs 2004–2018 〜ママ、この世界に未来はあるの〜	1 April 2019 (double CD); 13 April 2019 (double LP)	10+10	First volume; disc one contains studio versions and disc two the corresponding live versions.
Best Selection Songs 2004–2018 (Volume 2): Ballads 叙事歌	18 May 2020 (double LP); 27 May 2020 (double CD)	12+12	Second volume.
Best Selection Songs 2004–2018 (Volume 3): Reflection 倒影	12 November 2021 (double LP); 24 December 2021 (double CD)	10+10	Third volume.

=== Video releases ===
Video releases by Li Zhi
Title	Format	Released	Notes
Bring In the Wine	Double DVD	11 November 2007	Released by Koudai Records in a limited edition of 3,000. Disc one contains the "Bring In the Wine" concert at Star Live, Beijing; disc two his set at the 2007 Midi Music Festival and radio interviews.
The Incident of 16 October 2009	Double DVD	2010	Packaged with the live album of the same name; a small run was given away.
We Love Nanjing Too	Four DVDs	2011	Packaged with the live album of the same name.
Imagine	Double DVD	2012	Packaged with the live album of the same name.
108 Keywords	Double DVD	2013	Packaged with the live album of the same name.
Our 334 我们的叁叁肆	Web documentary series	From 10 April 2017	Follows the 334 Project; directed by Zhao Ke'er as a mixture of road film and reality show and released at irregular intervals. Divided into Anhui, Shaanxi–Ningxia, Yunnan and Shandong instalments, plus extras; uploaded to YouTube by Taihe Music in early 2019.
Three Missing One 2025 Tour – Kuala Lumpur: Complete Performance Record	4K Ultra HD Blu-ray	30 October 2026	26 songs from the November 2025 Kuala Lumpur shows, about 150 minutes, with behind-the-scenes footage of preparations, rehearsals and stage construction.

=== Songs in films ===
Songs by Li Zhi used in films
Year	Song	Film	Director
2012	"Sun" (日)	Mystery	Lou Ye
2015	"Has Man a Future" (2015 version)	Red Amnesia	Wang Xiaoshuai

== Tours and concerts ==
=== New Year's concerts ===
Li Zhi's New Year's concerts (in Nanjing unless stated)
Year	Theme	Venue	Guests
2009–10	None (35th stop of the "Wild Beasts" tour)	Gebi Bar, Yiwu	
2010–11	"We Love Nanjing Too" (Tang Chen Art Fund 2010 New Year's Concert)	Jiangnan Theatre	In order of appearance: Huanqing, Xiao He, Zhou Yunpeng, Ma Tiao, Wu Tun, Wan Xiaoli, Guo Long, Zhang Weiwei, Su Yang
2011–12	"Imagine"	Matrix Theatre	Sound Toy, Sound Fragment
2012–13	"108 Keywords" (Li Zhi's Self-Cultivation: 2012 Annual Report Performance)	Jiangnan Theatre	Zhang Chu
2013–14	"Three and Four" (勾三搭四)	Nanjing 520 Theatre	Ye Bei
2014–15	"i/O"	Nanjing Sun Palace Theatre	Pu Shu
2015–16	"Dongjing" (动静)	Nanjing Sun Palace Theatre	Ding Wei
2016–17	"Home" (家)	Nanjing Olympic Sports Center Gymnasium	Cui Jian
2017–18	"Believe in the Future" (相信未来)	Nanjing Olympic Sports Center Gymnasium	Zheng Jun
2018–19	"Turning Over a New Leaf" (洗心革面)	Oula Art Space (invitation only; streamed online)	Qibadian, Muma, Jiang Jianmin

=== Tours ===
Concert tours by Li Zhi
Year	Tour	Shows	Notes
2007	"Bring In the Wine" (将进酒)		
2008–09	"Going Alone to the Meeting" (单刀赴会)	15	
2009	"Wild Beasts" (动物凶猛)	34 (Note: A 2019 Jiemian report gives 34 shows in about 70 days; a 2016 Jiemian profile says that Li played 35 cities in 70 days. The 2009–10 New Year's show in Yiwu was also billed as the 35th stop of the tour.)	
2010	"Going Where I Haven't Been" (去没去过的地方)		
2011	European tour		August–September; cities included Paris, Amsterdam and Berlin.
2012	"Shine On You Crazy Prostate"	11	Title puns on Pink Floyd's "Shine On You Crazy Diamond".
2012	US acoustic tour	4	June–July. Boston ("Lobsters, Universities and Girls"), New York ("Lawyers, Women and Dogs"), San Francisco ("Bridges, Sunshine and Wine") and Los Angeles ("Films, Beaches and Balls").
2013	"Southern Cities in Late Spring" (春末的南方城市)	7	
2013	"Killing the Hen for the Eggs" (杀鸡取卵)	7	
2014	"Ting" (挺)	17	Small-band unplugged tour.
2015	"Seen" (看见)	7	Six shows in arenas and other large venues in mainland China, and one at Legacy Taipei on 21 August.
2016	"Dongjing" (动静)	17	
2017–19	334 Project	70 (Note: Of the 71 shows scheduled in 2017–18, one, in Weinan, was cancelled; all 23 shows planned for Sichuan in 2019 were cancelled.)	See § 334 Project.
2018	"Good Morning" (早上好)	3	Hong Kong, Taichung and Taipei.
2019	"Good Morning" (早上好)	5	Hong Kong, Kaohsiung, Taitung and Taipei.
2024	Three Missing One Japan Tour 2024	5	Osaka, Nagoya, Fukuoka, Sendai and Tokyo.
2025	Three Missing One 2025 Tour – Kuala Lumpur	3	11–13 November.
2026	Three Missing One 2026 Tour – Kuala Lumpur	3	13–15 November.

=== 334 Project ===
The 334 Project (叁叁肆计划), launched in 2017, was a plan to play all 334 prefecture-level divisions of mainland China over about 12 years, covering two or three provinces a year in two legs: the south in spring and the north in summer. Its stated aim was to bring live music to cities that touring musicians rarely visited, and many of the shows took place in hotel banquet halls, bars and local theatres. A film crew followed the tour for the documentary series Our 334. Several shows, including those in Huainan, Yulin, Baoji, Xianyang, Ankang, Baoshan and Chuxiong, were moved to new venues at short notice. The project has been suspended since the cancellation of the 2019 Sichuan leg.

Legs of the 334 Project
Year	Leg	Province(s)	Dates	Shows	Cities
2017	Spring	Anhui	6 March – 16 April	17	Chuzhou, Bengbu, Suzhou, Huaibei, Bozhou, Fuyang, Huainan, Lu'an, Anqing, Chizhou, Tongling, Huangshan, Xuancheng, Wuhu, Ma'anshan, Hefei (2)
2017	Summer	Shaanxi, Ningxia	7 July – 16 August	16 (Note: A further show, in Weinan on 13 July, was cancelled after the venue failed a fire-safety inspection and no replacement could be found in time.)	Xi'an (2), Shangluo, Tongchuan, Yan'an, Yulin, Shizuishan, Yinchuan (2), Wuzhong, Zhongwei, Guyuan, Baoji, Xianyang, Hanzhong, Ankang
2018	Spring	Yunnan	3 March – 21 April	18	Zhaotong, Qujing, Yuxi, Xishuangbanna, Pu'er, Lincang, Dehong, Baoshan, Nujiang, Dali (2), Lijiang, Diqing, Chuxiong, Honghe, Wenshan, Kunming (2)
2018	Summer	Shandong	6 July – 25 August	19	Jinan (2), Weihai, Yantai, Weifang, Rizhao, Linyi, Zaozhuang, Heze, Jining, Laiwu, Tai'an, Zibo, Dongying, Binzhou, Dezhou, Liaocheng, Qingdao (2)
2019	Spring	Sichuan	23 February – 20 April (planned)	0 of 23	All cancelled: Guangyuan, Bazhong, Dazhou, Guang'an, Nanchong, Suining, Ziyang, Neijiang, Meishan, Zigong, Luzhou, Yibin, Leshan, Panzhihua, Liangshan, Garzê, Ya'an, Mianyang, Deyang, Ngawa, Chengdu (3)
