= Southeast University =

Public university in Nanjing, Jiangsu, China

- 东南大学
- Former names: Sanjiang or Liangjiang Normal College (1902–1914) Nanking Higher Normal School (1915–1923); National Southeastern University (1921–1927); National Central University (1928–1949); National Nanking University (1949–1952) Nanjing Institute of Technology (1952–1988)
- Motto: 止于至善
- Motto in English: Strive for Perfection
- Type: Public
- Established: 1921; 105 years ago
- Affiliations: Excellence League
- President: Sun Youhong
- Faculty: 2,832
- Undergraduates: 16,125
- Postgraduates: 16,749
- Location: Nanjing, Jiangsu, China; 32°03′28″N 118°47′20″E
- Campus: Urban: Historical Sipailou Campus Urban: Medical Dingjiaqiao Campus Suburban: Main Jiulonghu Campus
- Colors
- Website: www.seu.edu.cn

Chinese name
- Simplified Chinese: 东南大学
- Traditional Chinese: 東南大學
Transcriptions
Standard Mandarin
- Hanyu Pinyin: Dōngnán Dàxué

Southeast University (SEU) is a public university in Nanjing, Jiangsu, China. It is affiliated with the Ministry of Education of China. The university is part of Project 211, Project 985, and the Double First-Class Construction.

Its precursor, Sanjiang Teachers College, was established in 1902 as a modern university on the former site of the Ming-era Guozijian. In 1921, the school changed its name to National Southeast University and became the second national university in China, and in 1928 was renamed National Central University, the nation's flagship university. After the Nationalist government lost Nanjing to the Chinese Communist Party during the Chinese Civil War, the university was renamed National Nanking University in August 1949. It was renamed Southeast University in May 1988.

== History ==
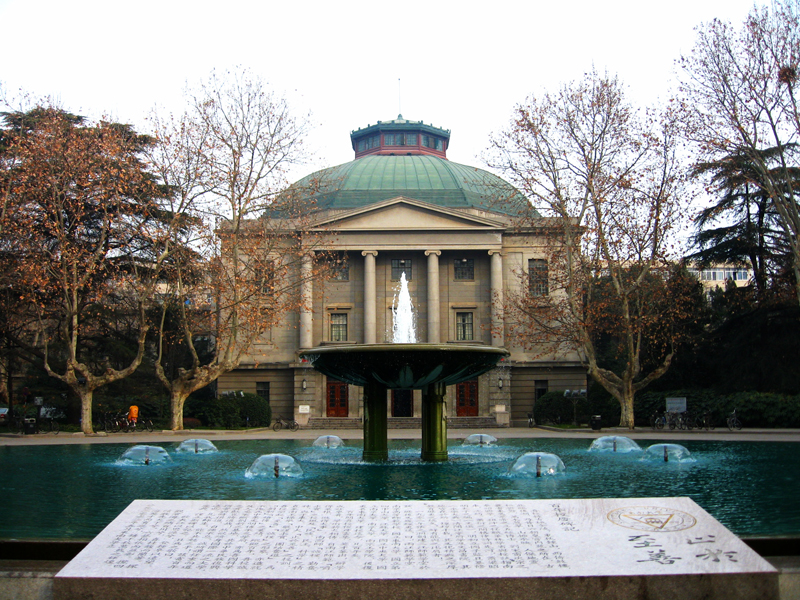
Auditorium of Southeast University

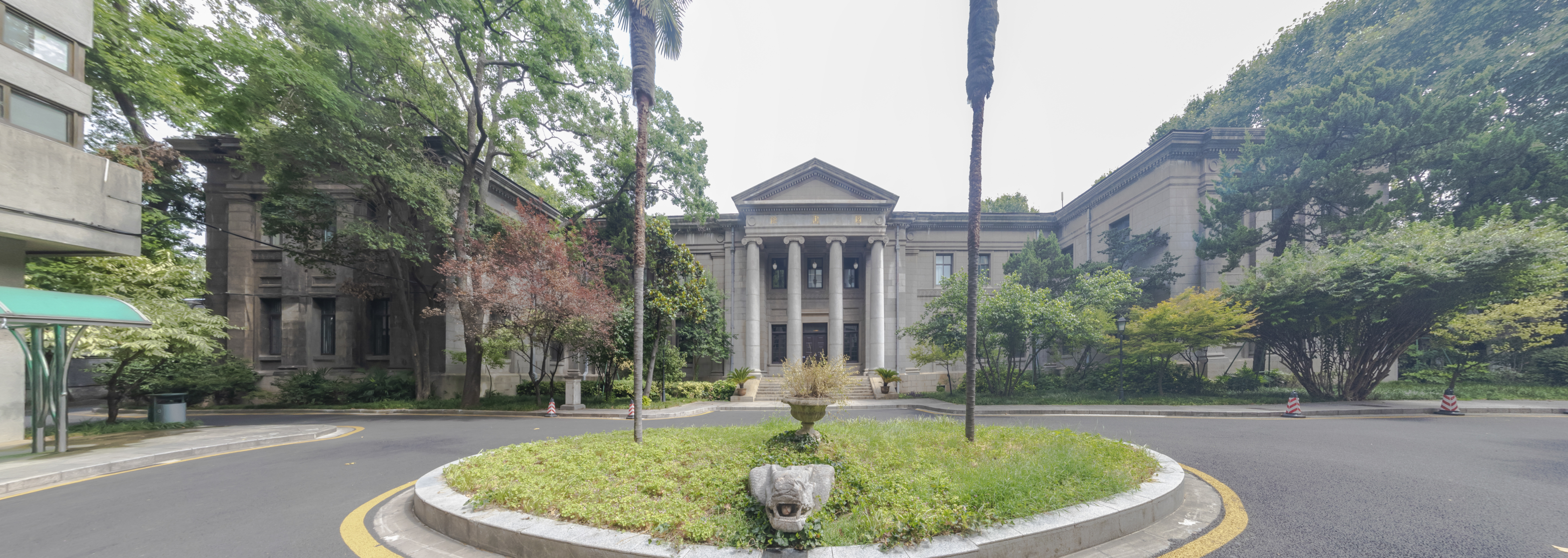
National Central University Mengfang Library

=== Imperial Academy (國子監) ===
The grounds of Sanjiang Normal College were established on the site of the Ming dynasty's first Guozijian, usually translated as the Imperial Academy. The institution had moved with the national capitals of the various dynasties throughout Chinese history but had originated under the Wu Emperor of the Jin dynasty, inspired by the royal schools of the Three Kingdoms such as the one established in Nanjing under Sun Xiu of Wu in 258.

=== Sanjiang Normal College (三江师范学堂) (1902–1905) ===
At the end of the 19th century, under the rule of the Qing dynasty, the China faced domestic trouble and foreign encroachment culminating in the Boxer Uprising of 1899 and the subsequent invasion by the Eight-Nation Alliance of foreign powers. In the aftermath in 1901, the Qing government began a program of education reform, and in 1902 issued the "Imperially Authorized School Regulations" (欽定學堂章程), initiating the creation of a national school system led by Zhang Baixi. On 30 May of the same year, the Viceroy of Liangjiang Liu Kunyi submitted a document of preparing colleges to the Qing government, proposing to open normal college in Jiangning (Nanjing). In February 1903, the successor Viceroy of Liangjiang Zhang Zhidong submitted a proposal to open Sanjiang Normal College to government, and authorize Miao Quansun as a representative to Japan for investigation, who later was nominated as the inspector of Sanjiang Normal College and responsible for the project preparation. In September 1903, Sanjiang Normal College officially opened.

=== Liangjiang Normal College (两江师范学堂) (1905–1911) ===
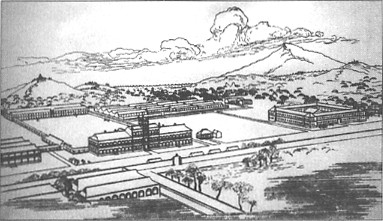
Liangjiang Normal College

Due to the ambiguous meaning of the college name which led to several disputes, the Sanjiang Normal College was named as Liangjiang Normal College in 1905. The year after, Li Ruiqing was nominated as the principal, who closed the junior normal subjects, and added the public subjects, professional subjects, and also created the first hand-painting subject in China. Until 1907, there had already been Geography-History department, Chinese-Foreign Language Department, Mathematic-Physics- Chemistry Department, and Agriculture Department. At the end of 1911, due to the outbreak of Xinhai Revolution, Liangjiang Normal College was almost closed.

=== National Nanjing Higher Normal School (南京高等师范学校) (1915–1923) ===
On 15 July 1914, Governor Han Guojun appointed Jiang Qian as principal, who was responsible for the starting up of Nanjing Higher Normal School in the same site of Liangjiang Normal College. Jiang employed the US-educated scholar Guo Bingwen as the dean of teaching, Chen Rong as the advisor, and sent both to Europe to investigate the education system and recruit teachers. On 10 September 1915, Nanjing Higher Normal School was officially started. In December 1919, Nanjing Higher Normal School formally recruited 8 female students and 50 more female visiting students, being the first school in China allowing both females and males to study together. The Polytechnic Faculty was established by the school in 1916.

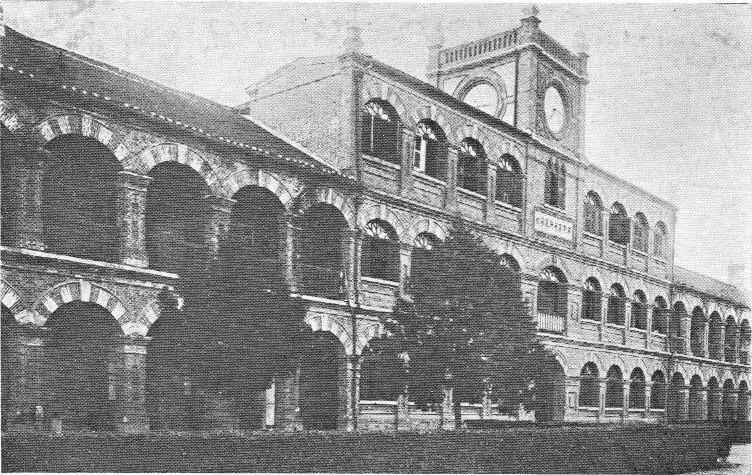
National Nanjing Higher Normal School, built in 1909

=== National Southeast University (国立东南大学) (1921–1924) ===
In September 1918, Guo Bingwen was the president in the south division. On 7 April 1920, Guo proposed the foundation of the "Southeast University Preparatory Committee". In September, Guo proposed to the State Council and the Ministry of Education to apply for the establishment of Southeast University, and in December it was approved. On 6 June 1921, the Board of Southeast University was established, Guo as president, and the university was officially opening in September. In December, the school council decided that Nanjing Higher Normal School would be incorporated into Southeast University. Southeast University, based on the foundation of Nanjing Normal Higher School, until 1923, had possessed arts and sciences, Education, engineering, agriculture, business totaling more than 20 lines in 5 subjects. Based on the Polytechnic Faculty of Nanjing Higher Normal School, the Engineering School of National Southeast University was established in 1921.

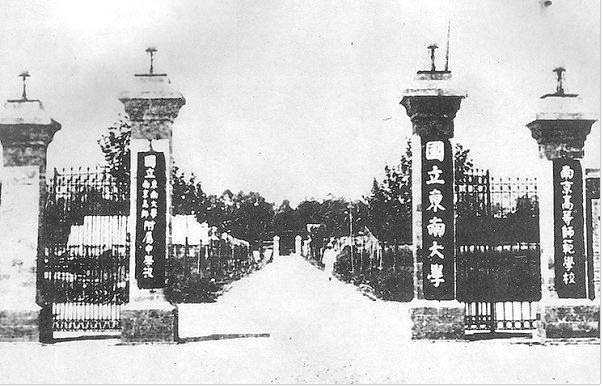
South gate of Southeast University

=== National Hohai Technology University (河海工程专门学校) (1924–1927) ===
In 1924, the Engineering School of National Southeast University merged with the water conservancy school Hohai Engineering School to form National Hohai Technology University, with Mao Yisheng as president.

=== National Central University (国立中央大学) (1927–1949) ===
In 1927, National Hohai Technology University along with several other schools merged with National Southeast University to form National Central University.

=== National Nanjing University (国立南京大学) (1949–1952) ===
In April 1949, the People's Liberation Army occupied Nanjing and the Nanjing Military Committee took over National Central University. On 8 August 1949, National Central University was renamed as National Nanjing University, and then Nanjing University in October 1950.

=== Nanjing Institute of Technology (南京工学院) (NIT, 1952–1988) ===
In 1952, the People's Republic of China began a national adjustment of its colleges. In Nanjing, the adjustment was mainly on Nanjing University and University of Nanking. Nanjing Institute of Technology was formed in the original site of National Central University from the Engineering School (at the time, the biggest school) of Nanjing University and the engineering departments of University of Nanking, including Chemistry Department and Electrical Machine Department. Later there were also some relevant subjects from Jiaotong University, Zhejiang University, Shandong University, Xiamen University, Fudan University, and Private Jiangnan University merged into Nanjing Institute of Technology.

=== Southeast University (东南大学) (1988 – present) ===
In June 1988, Nanjing Institute of Technology was renamed as 'Southeast University', starting to convert from a technology institute to a technology-featured comprehensive university. Since 2000, the name Nanjing Institute of Technology is used by a different institution.

In 2000, Nanjing Railway Medical College, Nanjing Higher Institute of Transportation and Nanjing Geological School were merged into Southeast University.

== Academic ==
Rankings
National by Subject (MOE)
| Art history | 1 |
| Biomedical engineering | 1 |
| Transport engineering | 1 |
| Architecture | 2 |
| Electronic engineering | 2 |
| Landscape architecture | 2 |
| Civil engineering | 3 |
| Urban planning | 3 |

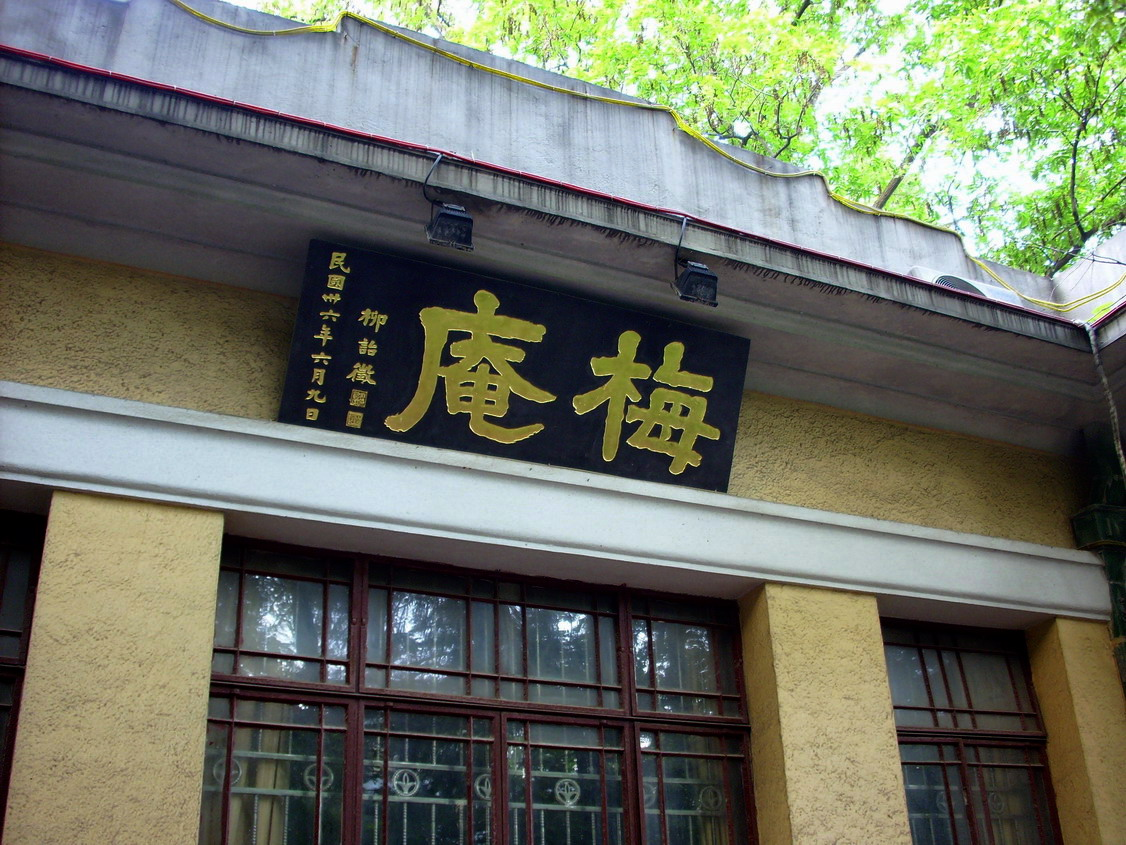
Mei'an, the building of SEU School of the Arts

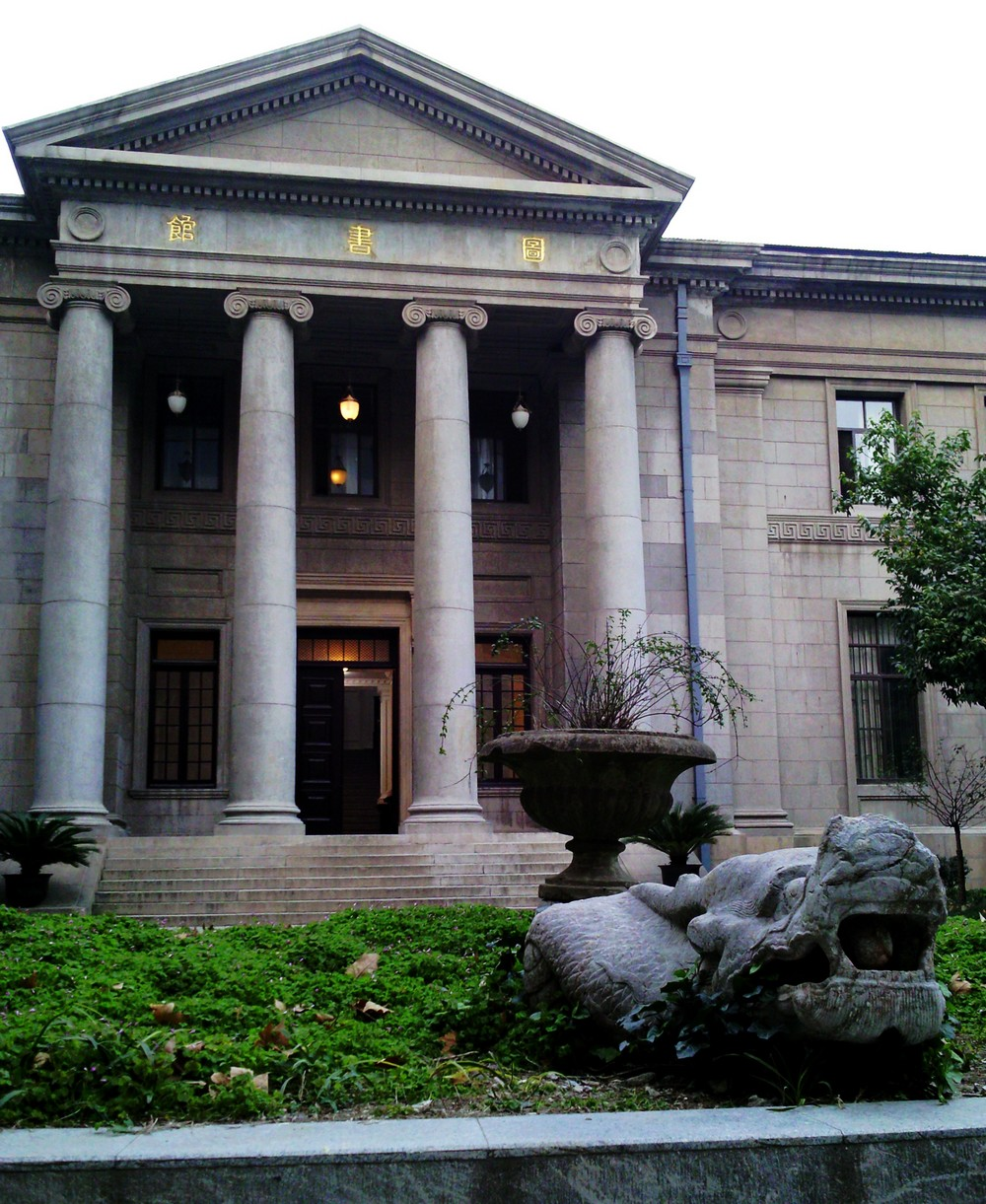
Mengfang Library, built in 1923

Southeast University is one of 32 universities directly administered by the Chinese Department of Education, which are considered the top class universities in China. The university has 16,000 undergraduate students and 10,000 graduate students in over 30 schools and departments. The admission to SEU is very competitive. Normally the university enrolls top 2% high school students from nationwide to its undergraduate programs, and top 5% undergraduate students to its graduate program. Most students are recruited by engineering or some big schools such as School of Mechanical Engineering, School of Energy & Environmental Engineering, School of Information Science & Engineering, School of Civil Engineering, School of Computer Science & Engineering, School of Economics & Management, as well as School of Transportation Engineering. The rest students are enrolled by some smaller schools and departments like School of Automation, School of Electronic Science, and Department of Physics.

There are about 5,600 faculty members in Southeast University. Among all the faculty members, there are 8 members of Chinese Academy, 25 "Changjiang Scholars", 1 fellow of State Department Degree Committee, 9 members of State Department Degree Committee, 31 distinguished national youth research scientists, 7 members (ranking 2nd nationwide) of "863 Projects" expert committee, and 57 excellent Department of Education research scientists.

The university has 64 undergraduate programs, 206 master programs, 109 doctoral programs, as well as 15 postdoctoral research sites. In the most recent official rankings summary, 6 programs are top 5 and another 6 programs are top 10 nationwide. Especially the School of Biomedical Science & Engineering ranks first place. The university has a top research ability. There are 10 National First-class Academic programs, 6 potential National First-class Academic Programs. 3 National Research Labs, 1 National Professional Lab, 2 National Engineering Research Centers, and 7 Department of Education First-class Labs.

In 2006, the research funds for the university is 600 million Chinese Yuan, which lists the 7th place in the country.

=== Rankings ===
University rankings
| BCUR National | Domestic | 16 |
| Wu Shulian National | Domestic | 19 |
| CUAA National | Alumni | 21 |
| QS National | General | 25 |
| THE National | General | 19 |
| QS Asia (Asia version) | General | =134 |
| THE Asia (Asia version) | General | =51 |
| ARWU World | Research | 89 |
| QS World | General | =392 |
| THE World | General | 251–300 |
| USNWR World | General | 155 |

Southeast University is one of the top 20 universities in scientific research and development in China. It has over 20 national or provincial research institutes, with a number of key research bases. Over the last decade, it has completed more than 1000 research projects, of which over 500 have been awarded the national, provincial or municipal science and technology prizes. Its research fund exceeded 1.1 billion yuan in 2010, which placed 11th nationwide. The SEU Architecture Design and Research Institute, which is one of the few national first-class design institutes, has undertaken various major projects. The SEU-affiliated Zhongda Hospital was set up in 1935 and rated as "Class A Grade 3" by the Ministry of Public Health.

In 2007, Southeast University was listed 443rd among world universities. In 2010, according to a leading scientific journal "Nature" (Nature Publishing Index 2010 China), the report ranked Southeast University as the 8th among all domestic research institutes.

In 2010 QS top university ranking, it was ranked: 87th overall among Asian universities, 76th in engineering and I.T. among Asian universities, 301–350th in engineering and I.T worldwide. In 2016, Southeast University was ranked 201–300 in ARWU World University Ranking, and 20th in ARWU Field - Engineering Ranking. In 2017 Chinese national university ranking edited by Wu Shulian, Southeast University was placed 14th in the national university ranking in China, together with other 22 universities as China's top-tier national universities.

In 2020 ARWU World University Ranking, Southeast University's global rank rose to 101–150, and national rank as 7–13.

== Campus ==
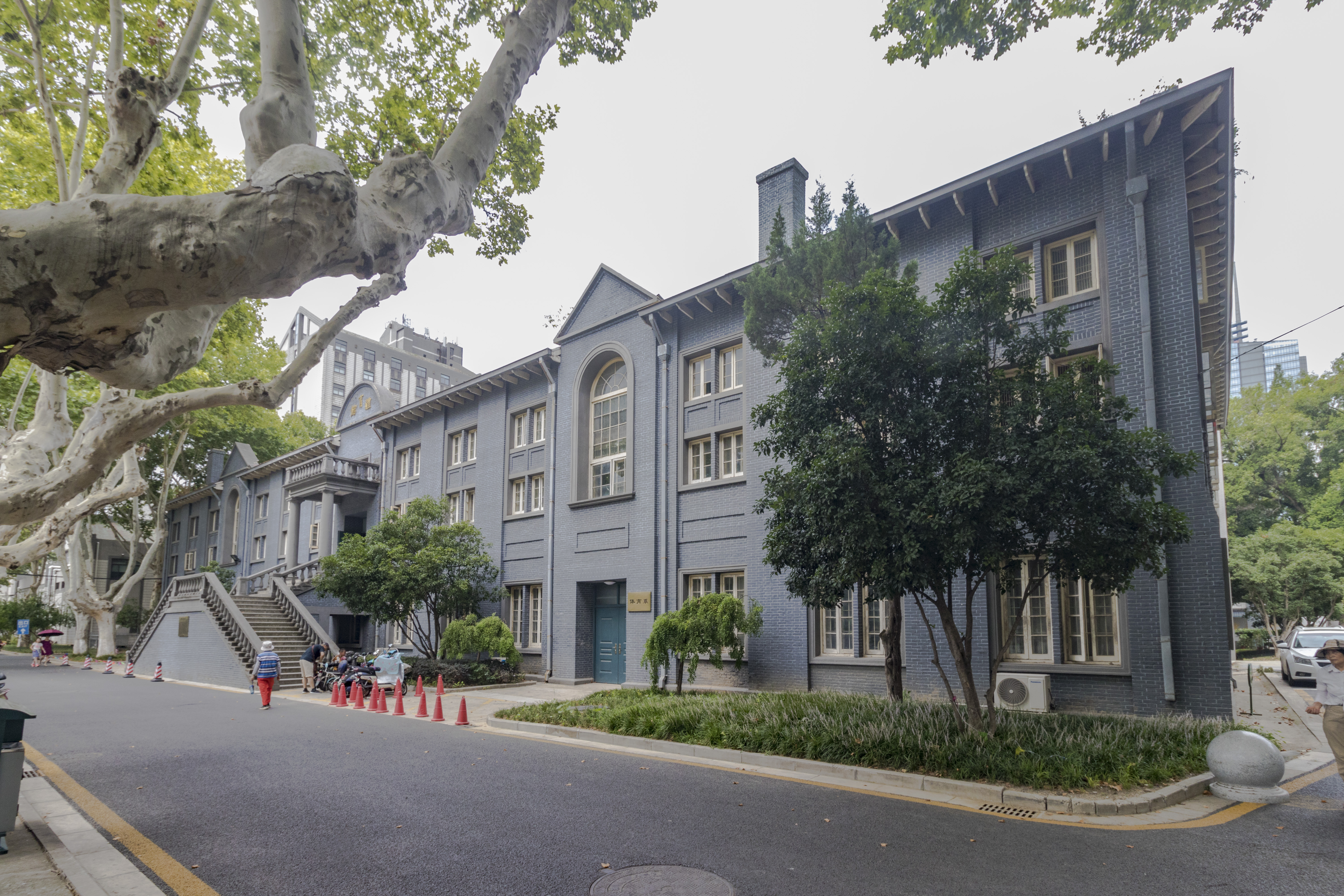
National Central University Sports Hall

There are 3 main campuses of Southeast University namely Sipailou Campus, Jiulonghu campus and Dingjiaqiao campus. Sipailou (Xuanwu District) and Dingjiaqiao campus (Gulou district) are in Nanjing city and Jiulonghu campus in suburbs of Nanjing (Jiangning District).

The Sipailou Campus of Southeast University is the flagship campus that is inherited from National Central University. It is located at 2 Sipailou, Nanjing, China. In 1988, Pukou Campus which located in Pukou Campus across the Yangtze River was opened as another site mainly for the education of first and second year students (freshman and sophomores). However, in 2008 Pukou Campus was separated from Southeast University and was then acquired by Cheng Xian Institute.

In 2001, SEU acquired three other colleges in Nanjing. They are: Nanjing Railway Medical College, Nanjing College of Advanced Transportation, as well as Nanjing Advanced School of Geology. Nanjing Railway Medical College became the School of Medicine at Southeast University after it merged with SEU. The medical school is located in Dingjiaqiao.

In 2005, when Jiulonghu Campus, located in Jiangning District, was founded, the authority of Pukou Campus was transferred to the Chengxian College of Southeast University. Most of the undergraduate students and master students are studying at Jiulonghu Campus currently. After Jiulonghu Campus was opened, the Sipailou Campus basically includes some most important research institutes and administrations of the university. Jiulonghu Campus is situated in the south of the Jiangning Technology Development District, to the east of Suyuan Avenue, west of Shuanglong Street, and south of Jiyin Street. It is around 20 kilometers away from the Sipailou Campus, with an area of 3749mu. The architecture design of Jiulonghu Campus follows the basis of Southeast University's culture, characterized in the combination of public teaching and research which compromises the merit of Chinese and Western styles, forming a green and active university community. The total building area in Jiulonghu Campus is 574 thousand square meters with the investment of 1.6 billion yuan.

== Schools and departments ==
- Office of President
- Education Foundation
- University history
- Chien-Shiung Wu Memorial Hall
- Galileo training and application research center
- General Alumni Association of Southeast University
- School of Architecture
- School of Mechanical Engineering
- School of Energy & Environment Engineering
- School of Information Science & Engineering
- School of Civil Engineering
- School of Electronic Science & Engineering
- Department of Mathematics & Applied Mechanics
- School of Automation
- School of Computer Science & Engineering
- Department of Physics
- School of Biological Science & Medical Engineering
- School of Material Science & Engineering
- School of Economics & Management
- School of Electrical Power Engineering
- School of Foreign Languages
- School of Chemistry and Chemical Engineering
- School of Transportation Engineering
- School of Instrument Science & Engineering
- School of Art
- School of Humanities
- School of Law
- School of Medicine
- School of Public Health
- Department of Physical Education
- School of Continuing Education
- College of Software Engineering
- Cheng Xian College
- College of Integrated Circuit
- Wu Jian Xiong (Chien-Shiung Wu) College
- School of Cyber Science & Engineering

== Notable people and alumni ==
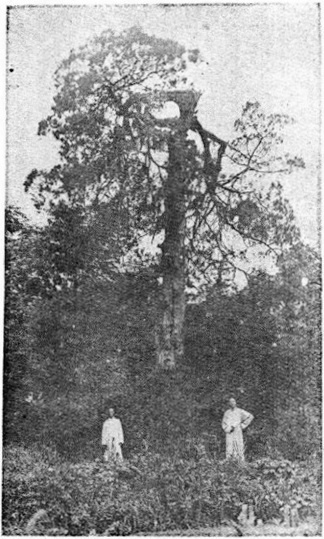
The Six-Dynasty Juniper, a 1500-year-old Chinese juniper on the school grounds, tracing its origin to the Liang imperial palace located at the site in the 6th century

=== Politicians ===
- Chiang Kai-shek (蔣介石), President of Republic of China
- Huang Wei (黄卫), vice chairman of Xinjiang Uygur Autonomous Region, the former Vice Minister of Construction (Civil Engineering)
- Dio Wang, Australian senator

=== Scientists ===
- Chien-Shiung Wu, physicist, known as the "Oriental Marie Curie", with β-decay experiments demonstrating that in the weak interaction, symmetry is not conserved
- Huang Weilu, missile engineer, recipient of the Two Bombs, One Satellite Medal
- Ren Xinmin, missile engineer, recipient of the Two Bombs, One Satellite Medal
- Mao Yisheng, bridge engineer
- Zhou Ren (周仁), Metallurgy and ceramics scientist
- Yang Tingbao, architect, one of the "Five Masters of Architecture"
- Qi Kang, Architect
- Wu Liangyong, Architect
- Chen Wen Hsi (陈文禧), Machinery expert
- Yang Liming (杨立铭), Nuclear physicist
- Wu Zhongwei (吴中伟), Materials scientist
- Zhang Zhongjun (张钟俊), Control theorist
- Ping King Tien (田炳耕), Electronic scientist
- Liu Shenggang (刘盛纲), Electronic scientist
- Xia Peisu (夏培肃), computer scientist
- Xiaohu Yu, academic staff and engineer
- Gao Hong (高鸿), Chemist
- Min Enze, chemist
- Min Guirong (闵桂荣), aerospace engineer
- Ding Henggao (丁衡高), high-precision machinery expert
- Yang Huanming, Geneticist
- Zhengxu Zhao (赵正旭), Chief scientist of space mission visualization & control, Professor & Fellow of British Royal Society of Arts (FRSA)
- Harry Shum (沈向洋), Computer scientist, Executive Vice President of Artificial Intelligence & Research at Microsoft.

=== Others ===
- Yung Ho Chang (张永和), Owner of 'Architecture Prize' awarded by American Academy of Arts, Professor of the U.S. Massachusetts Institute of Technology (MIT), Department of Architecture (Department of Architecture, 81)
- Cheng Taining (程泰宁), Chief Architect in Chinese United Engineering Corporation, Host of Chinese United Cheng Training Architectural Design Institute(56)
- Harry Shum (沈向洋), Microsoft's senior vice president and chief scientist of the National Natural Science Foundation judges (Youth Class)
- Li Zhi, music artist banned from PRC for references to 1989 Tiananmen Square protests and massacre
