= Xiaohe =

Xiaohe (little river) may refer to the following locations in China:

- Xiaohe Cemetery, bronze-age burial site in Xinjiang
- Xiaohe District (小河区), former district of Guiyang, Guizhou
- Xiaohe, Liuyang (小河乡), Hunan
- Xiaohe, Shitai County, Anhui
- Xiaohe, Xun County, Henan
- Xiaohe, Wanquan in Wanquan, Honghu, Jingzhou, Hubei
- Xiaohe (crocodile) (湾鳄小河), World's largest crocodile raised in captivity
