= Min Guirong =

Chinese thermophysicist (1933–2021)

- 闵桂荣
- Born: 2 June 1933; Putian, Fujian, China
- Died: 28 April 2021 (aged 87); Beijing, China
- Education: Xiamen University; Southeast University
- Scientific career
- Fields: Engineering thermophysics Space technology
- Workplaces: China Academy of Space Technology

Chinese name
- Traditional Chinese: 閔桂榮
- Simplified Chinese: 闵桂荣
Transcriptions
Standard Mandarin
- Hanyu Pinyin: Mǐn Guìróng

Min Guirong (Chinese: 闵桂荣; 2 June 1933 – 28 April 2021) was a Chinese thermophysicist and space technologist. He was an academician of the Chinese Academy of Sciences and the Chinese Academy of Engineering. He was a member of the 8th and 9th National Committee of the Chinese People's Political Consultative Conference.

== Biography ==
Min was born in Putian, Fujian, on 2 June 1933, to a family of farming background. After graduating from Putian No.1 High School in 1952, he was admitted to Xiamen University. In 1952, Mao Zedong's government re-grouped the country's higher education institutions with individual institutions tending to specialize in a certain field of study after the Soviet model. He transferred to Nanjing Institute of Technology (now Southeast University). He joined the Chinese Communist Party in March 1955. In 1960, he was sent to the Soviet Academy of Sciences (now Russian Academy of Sciences) to study on government scholarships. He returned to China in 1963 and that same year became a researcher at the Institute of mechanics, Chinese Academy of Sciences. He participated in the design of China's first man-made satellite between 1965 and 1968. In 1968, he was promoted to vice president of China Academy of Space Technology, and served until January 1985. On 28 April 2021, he died of illness in Beijing, aged 87.

== Honors and awards ==
- 1991 Member of the Chinese Academy of Sciences (CAS)
- 1994 Member of the Chinese Academy of Engineering (CAE)
