= Guozijian =

Chinese imperial university and its Vietnamese equivalent

Chinese name
- Traditional Chinese: 國子監
- Simplified Chinese: 国子监
- Literal meaning: Directorate for the Sons of the Nation
Transcriptions
Standard Mandarin
- Hanyu Pinyin: Guózǐjiàn
- Wade–Giles: Kuo^{2}-tzŭ^{3}-chien^{4}
- IPA: [kwǒ.tsɹ̩̀.tɕjɛ́n]
Yue: Cantonese
- Jyutping: Gwok3-zi2-gaam1
- IPA: [kʷɔk̚˧.tsi˧˥.kam˥]

Guozixue
- Traditional Chinese: 國子學
- Simplified Chinese: 国子学
- Literal meaning: School for the Sons of the Nation
Transcriptions
Standard Mandarin
- Hanyu Pinyin: Guózǐxué
- Wade–Giles: Kuo-tzŭ-hsüeh

Guozisi
- Traditional Chinese: 國子寺
- Simplified Chinese: 国子寺
- Literal meaning: Office for the Sons of the Nation
Transcriptions
Standard Mandarin
- Hanyu Pinyin: Guózǐsì
- Wade–Giles: Kuo-tzŭ-szu

Vietnamese name
- Vietnamese alphabet: Quốc tử Giám; Quốc Học viện
- Chữ Hán: 國子監 國學院

Korean name
- Hangul: 국자감
- Hanja: 國子監
Transcriptions
- Revised Romanization: Gukjagam
- McCune–Reischauer: Kukchagam

Manchu name
- Manchu script: ᡤᡠᡵᡠᠨ ᡳ ᠵᡠᠰᡝ ᠪᡝ ᡥᡡᠸᠠᡧᠠᠪᡠᡵᡝ ᠶᠠᠮᡠᠨ
- Möllendorff: gurun-i juse be hūwašabure yamun

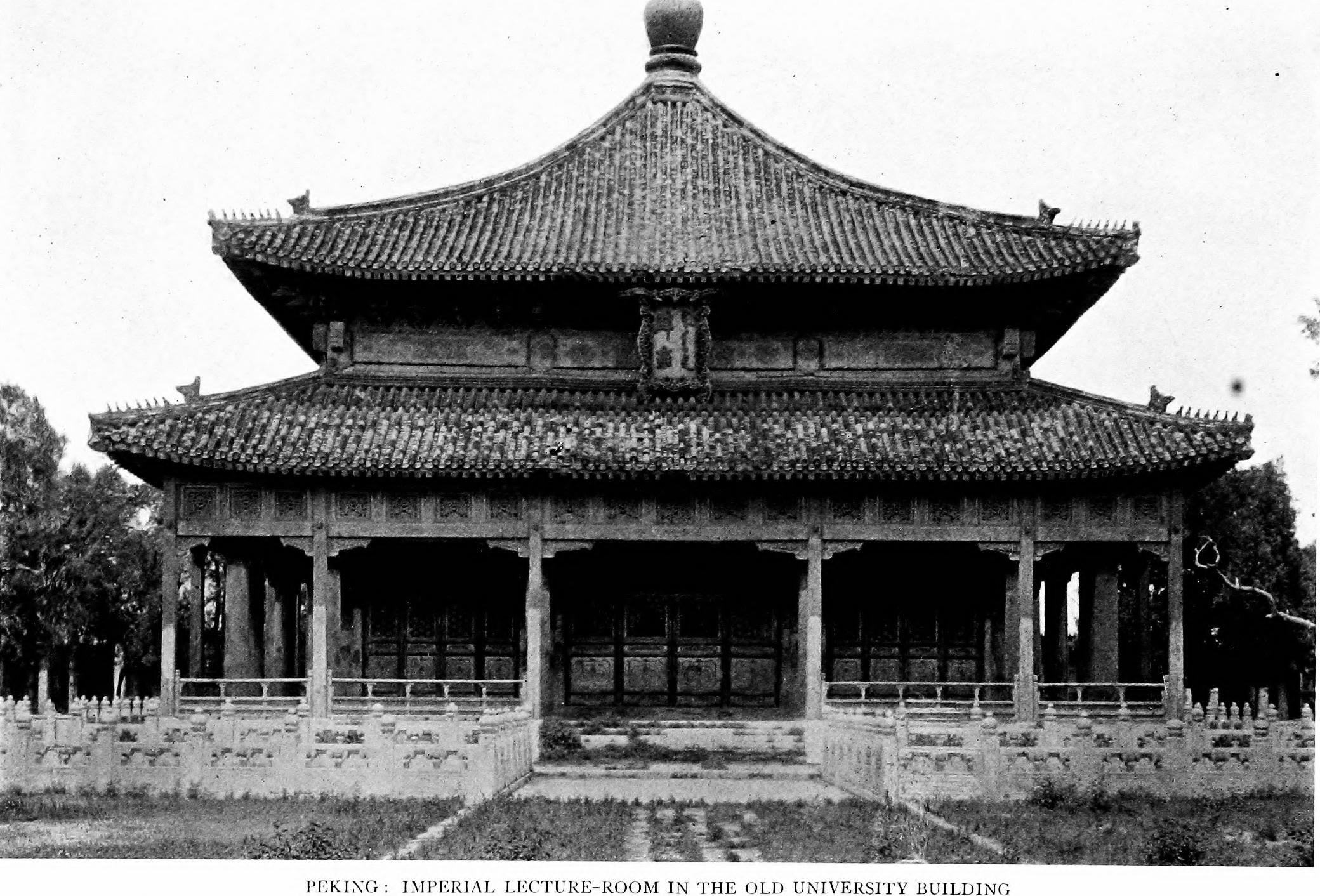
Biyong, the imperial lecture hall in the Beijing Guozijian

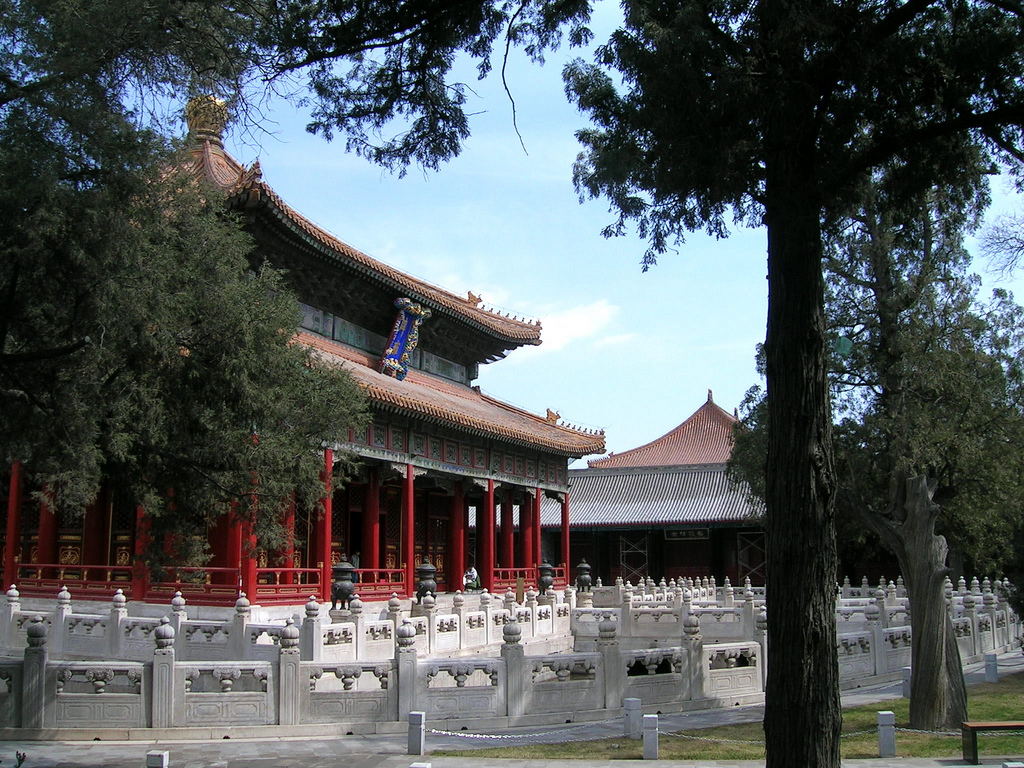
The imperial lecture hall and classrooms at the Beijing Guozijian

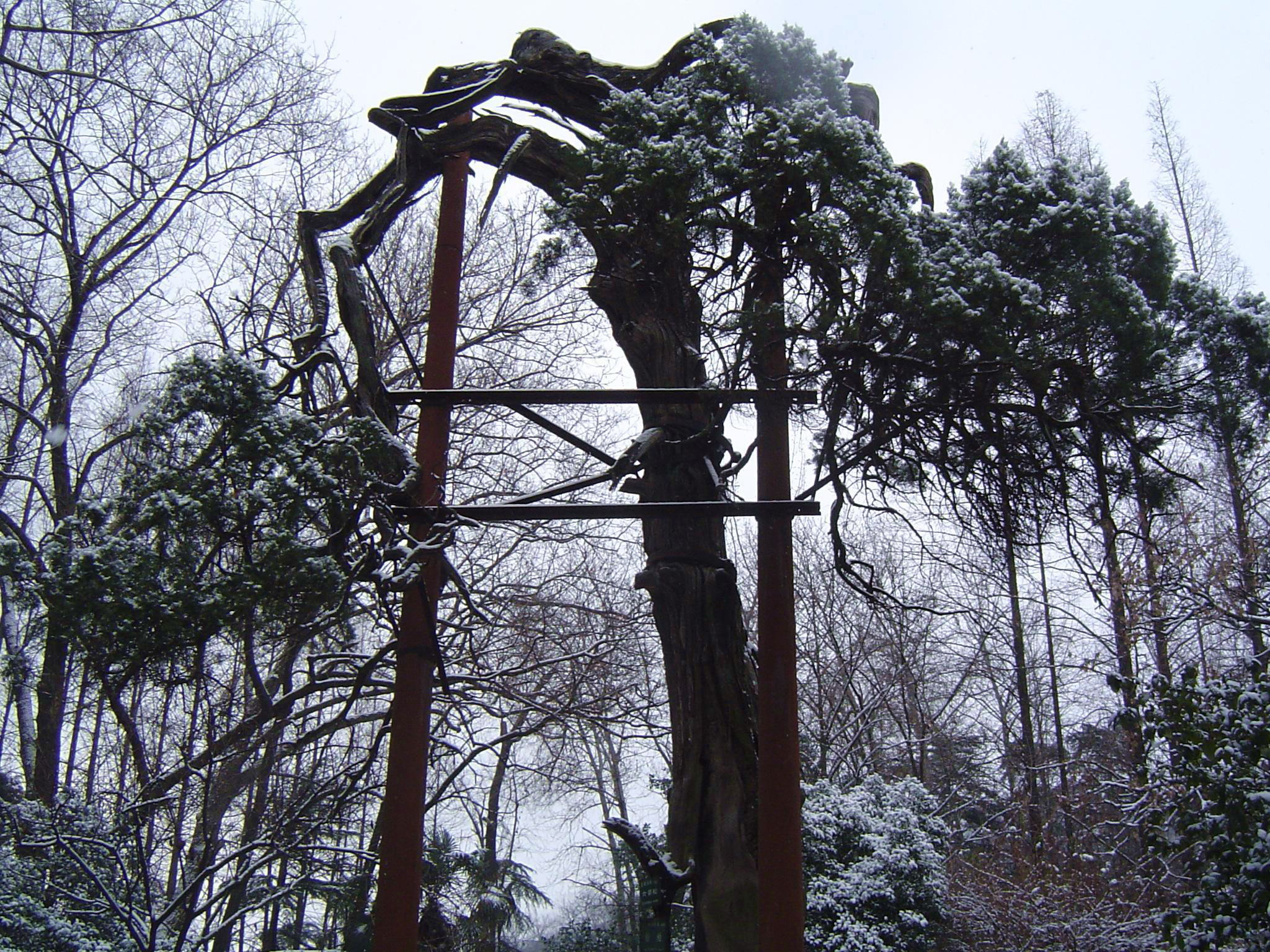
The Six-Dynasty Juniper on the former site of the Nanjing Guozijian

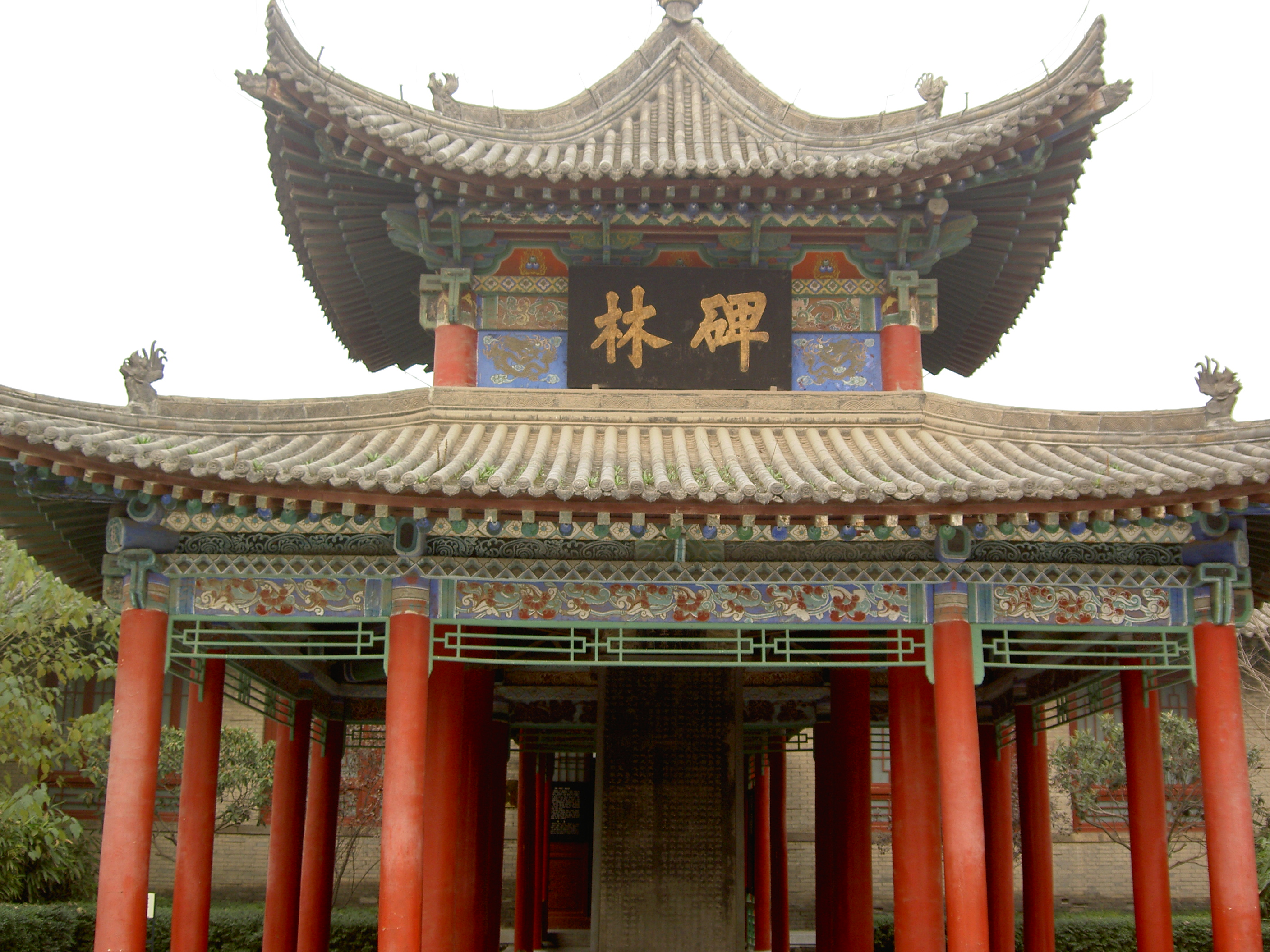
The Stele Forest in Xi'an, including the collection of the Chang'an Guozijian of the Sui and Tang

The Guozijian, sometimes translated as the Imperial College, Imperial Academy, Imperial University, National Academy, or National University, was the highest level academic and educational institution throughout most of Imperial China's history. It was created during the reign of Emperor Wu of Jin and became the highest level academic institution in China over the next 200 years. After the demise of the Song dynasty, it became synonymous with the previous highest level academic institution, the Taixue. The Guozijian was abolished in 1907 during the Qing dynasty.

== History ==
=== Jin ===
The Guozixue was founded under Emperor Wu of Jin (r. 265–289) to educate his sons. After the nine rank system was introduced for grading bureaucrats in the Chinese government, the Guozijian was created for persons rank five and above, effectively making it the educational institution for nobles, while the Taixue was relegated to teaching commoners. The Taixue was subsumed under the Guozijian and taught the gongsheng ("tribute students"), the top scorers of the imperial examination, while the Guozijian educated the nobility.

=== Northern & Southern Dynasties ===
Over the next 200 years, the Guozijian became the primary educational institute in the Southern Dynasties. The Sixteen Kingdoms and Northern Dynasties also created their own schools but they were only available for sons and relatives of high officials. The Northern Wei dynasty founded the Primary School of Four Gates.

=== Sui & Tang ===
During the Sui dynasty, a Law School, Arithmetics School, and Calligraphy School were put under the administration of the Guozijian. These schools accepted the relatives of officials rank eight and below while the Taixue, Guozijian, and Four Gates School served higher ranks. By the start of the Tang dynasty (618–907), 300 students were enrolled in the Guozijian, 500 at the Taixue, 1,300 at the Four Gates School, 50 at the Law School, and a mere 30 at the Calligraphy and Arithmetics Schools. Emperor Gaozong of Tang (r. 649–683), founded a second Guozijian in Luoyang. The average age of admission was 14 to 19 but 18 to 25 for the Law School. Students of these institutions who applied for the state examinations had their names transmitted to the Ministry of Rites, which was also responsible for their appointment to a government post.

=== Song ===
Under the Song dynasty, the Guozijian became the central administrative institution for all state schools throughout the empire. Among its duties were the maintenance of the buildings, the construction of new facilities, and the promotion of students. The Guozijian itself was equipped with a library and printing shop to create model printing blocks for distribution.

Around 1103, the Guozijian established its School of Medicine (醫學, Yīxué). The institution legitimized the study of medicine among the empire's nobility and upper classes, who had previously considered it a mere craft. The medical school graduates were licensed for work within the Imperial Medical Bureau (尚藥局, Shàngyàojú) but also separately granted a formal title.

In 1104, the prefectural examinations were abolished in favor of the three-colleges system, which required each prefecture to send an annual quota of students to the Taixue. This drew criticism from some officials who claimed that the new system benefited the rich and young, and was less fair because the relatives of officials could enroll without being examined for their skills. In 1121, the local three-college system was abolished but retained at the national level. For a time, the national examination system was also abandoned in favor of directly appointing students of the Taixue to government posts. The Taixue itself did not survive the demise of the Song dynasty and ceased to exist afterwards, Taixue thereafter becoming a synonym for the Guozijian.

=== Ming ===
During the Ming dynasty, the Hongwu Emperor promoted the study of law, math, calligraphy, equestrianism, and archery at the Guozijian.

=== Qing ===
The Guozijian was abolished in 1907.

== Locations ==
The Guozijian was located in the national capital of each Chinese dynasty, such as Chang'an, Luoyang, Kaifeng, and Hangzhou. In early years of the Ming, the Guozijian was in Nanjing. Afterwards, the Ming had two capitals, so there were two Guozijians: one in Nanjing (claimed as the parent institution of Southeast University, Nanjing University, and National Central University) and one in Beijing. During the Qing dynasty, the sole Guozijian was in Beijing.

The Beijing Guozijian, located on Guozijian Street in the Dongcheng District, was an or the imperial college during the Yuan, Ming, and Qing dynasties. Most of the current buildings were built during the Ming dynasty. It was the last Guozijian in China and is reckoned as the predecessor of Peking University.

== Vietnam ==
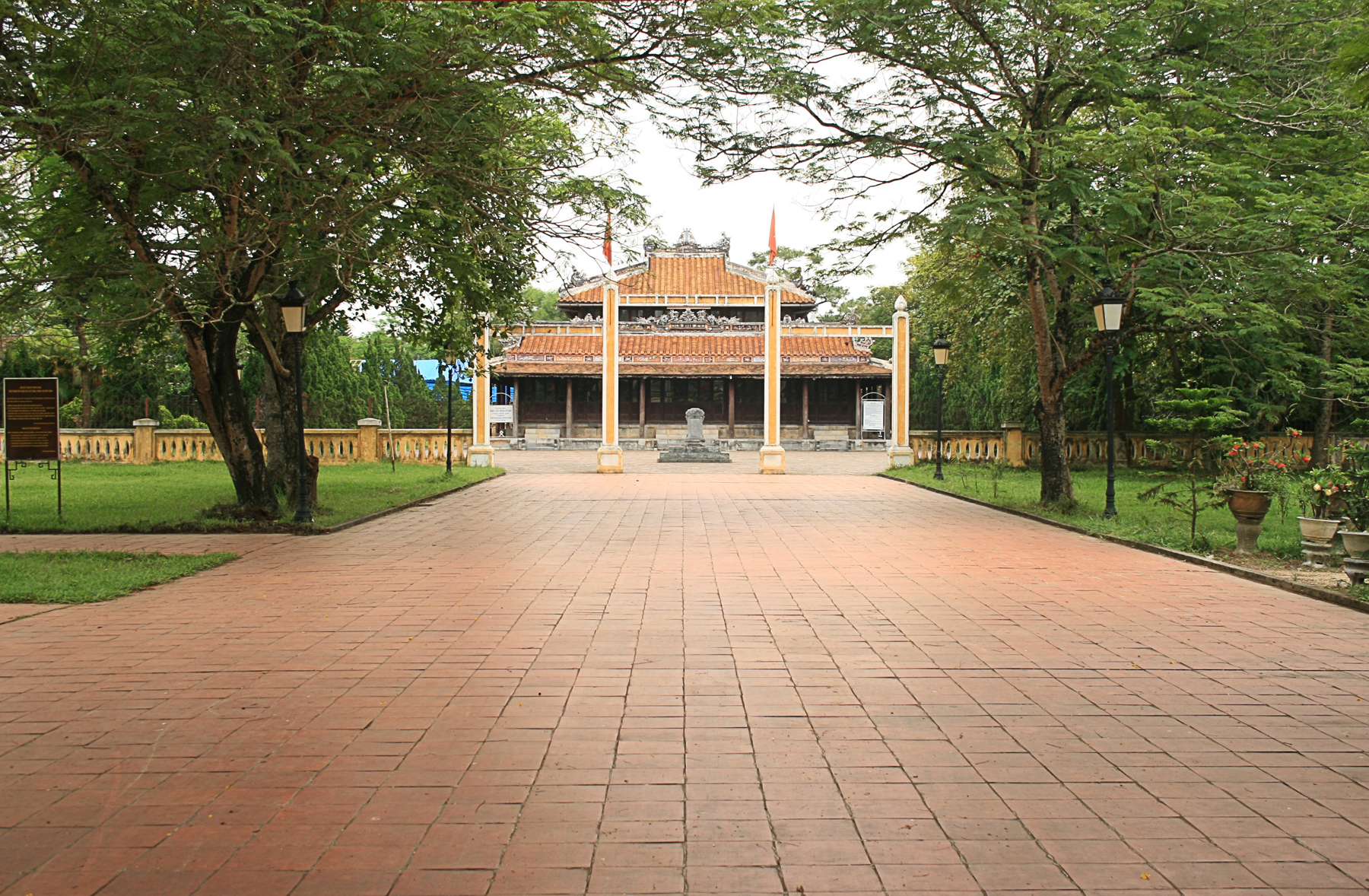
Entrance of the imperial academy in Huế, central Vietnam

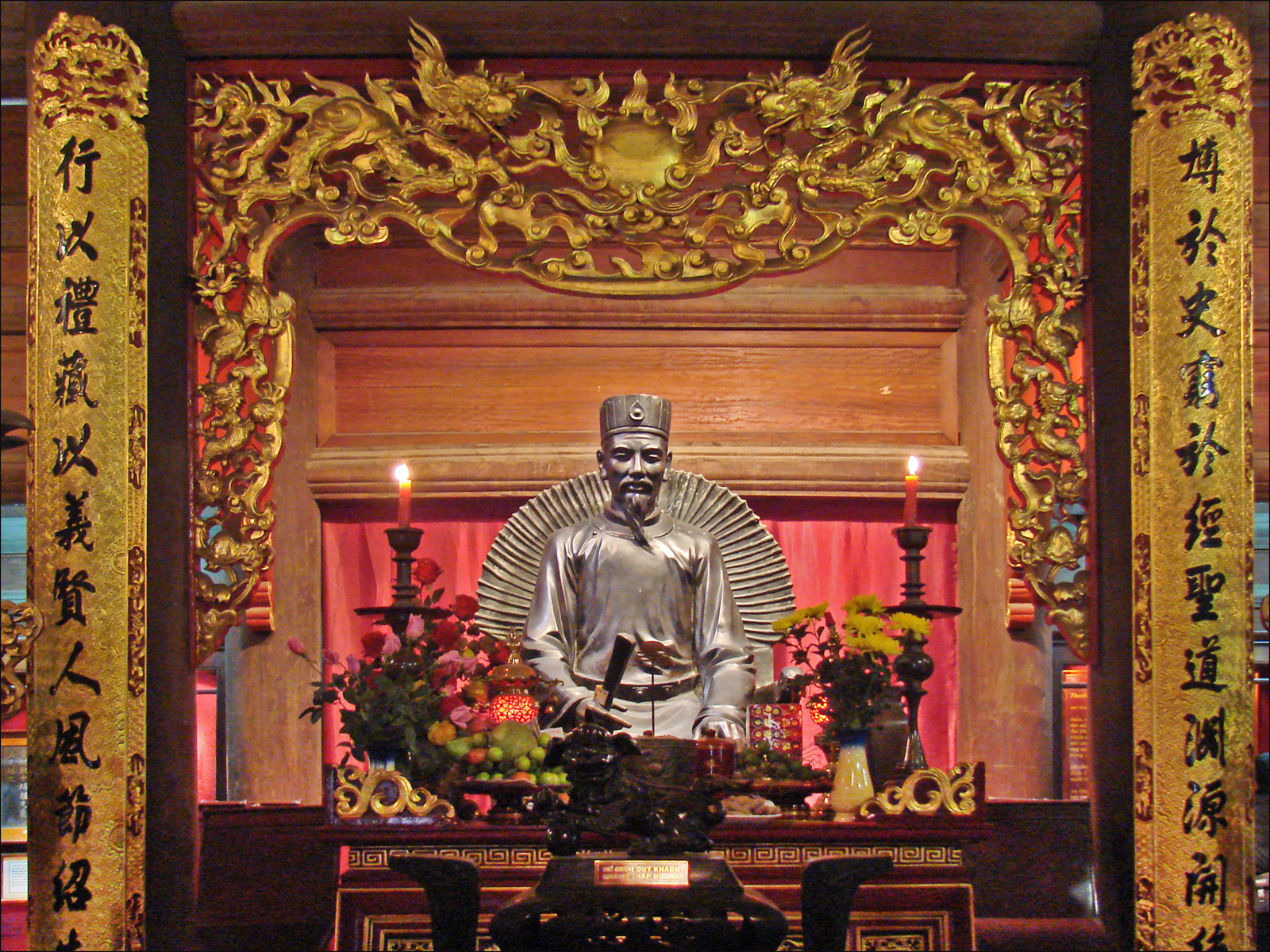
Altar to Chu Văn An, rector of the imperial academy

In Vietnam, a year after the first Confucian examinations established by Lý Nhân Tông (李仁宗), the Guozijian (Vietnamese: Quốc tử giám, chữ Hán: 國子監) was built in 1076 on the site of the Temple of Literature. It was Vietnam's first university, it lasted from 1076 to 1779. In 1802, the Nguyễn dynasty founded the Huế capital where they established a new imperial academy in the new capital. Several notable rectors of the Quốc tử giám in Hanoi were Chu Văn An, Nguyễn Phi Khanh, and Vũ Miên.

== See also ==
- Beijing Guozijian
- Sŏnggyun'gwan, Seoul, & Kukchagam, the Korean equivalent
- Imperial Academy, Hue, the Vietnamese equivalent
- Ancient higher-learning institutions & National university
- Peking, Nanjing, Southeast, & National Central University
- Academies (Shuyuan)
- Yuelu Academy (now Hunan University)
