= Six-Dynasty Juniper =

Ancient tree in Nanjing, China

Coordinates: 32.0589°N 118.7865°E

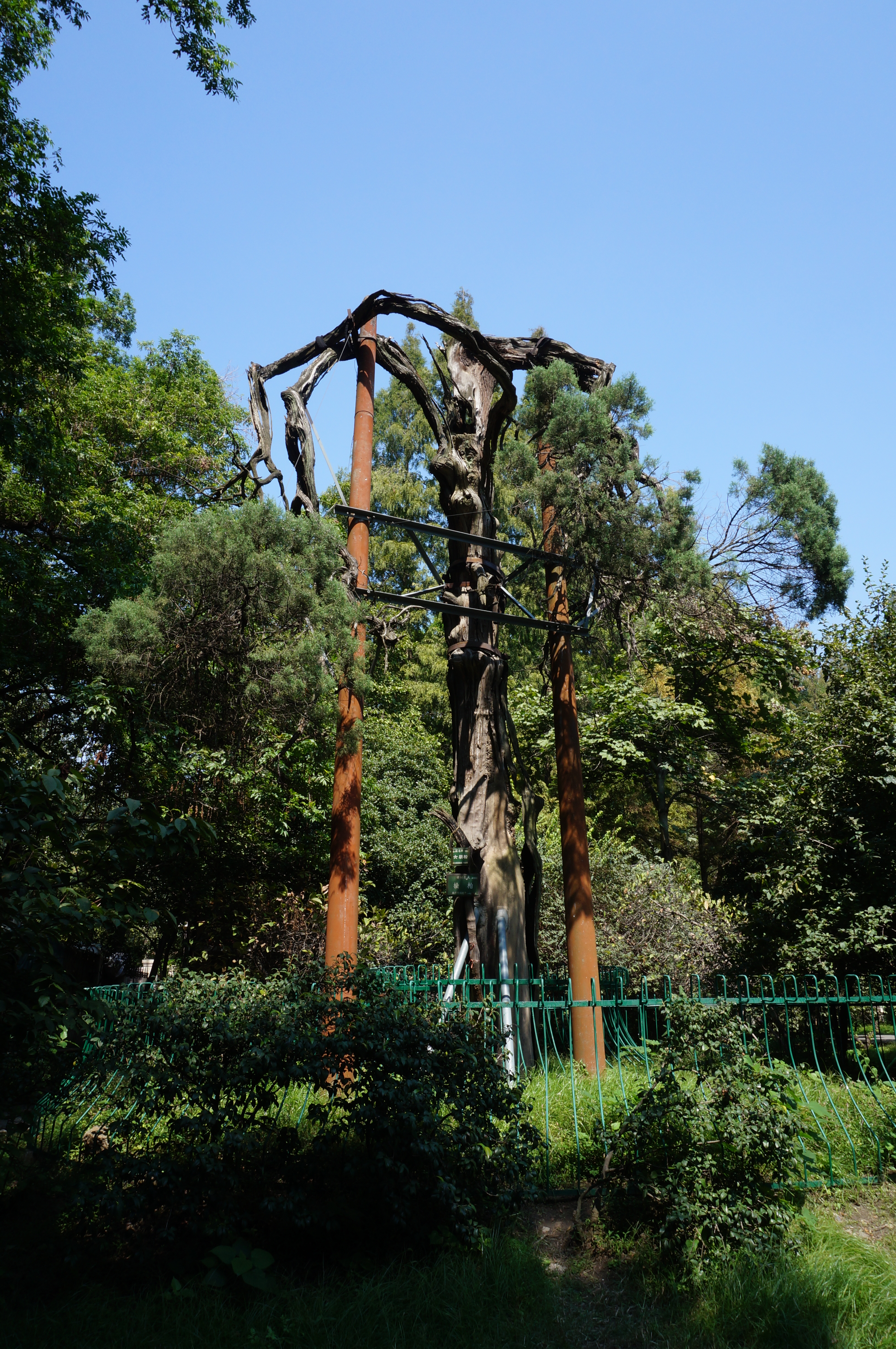
- The tree in 2013
- Chinese: 六朝松
- Literal meaning: Six-Dynasty Pine
Transcriptions
Standard Mandarin
- Hanyu Pinyin: Liùcháo Sōng
- Wade–Giles: Liu-ch'ao Sung

The Six-Dynasty Juniper is a Chinese juniper tree on the campus of Southeast University in Nanjing, Jiangsu, China.

== History ==
Over 1500 years old, the tree dates to the reign of the Wu Emperor (r. 502–549) of the Liang dynasty, one of the Six Dynasties that used Jiankang (now Nanjing) as their capital from the 3rd to the 6th centuries. The juniper was planted within the Liang imperial palace compound. The palace was later destroyed by war but the tree has survived to the present day. The first Imperial Academy of the Ming was later built on the palace's former grounds during the reign of the Hongwu Emperor, who used Yingtian (now Nanjing) as his main capital. At the beginning of the 20th century, the Sanjiang Normal College was given the site, eventually developing into Southeast University and Nanjing University in Nanjing and the National Central University in Taoyuan City on Taiwan.

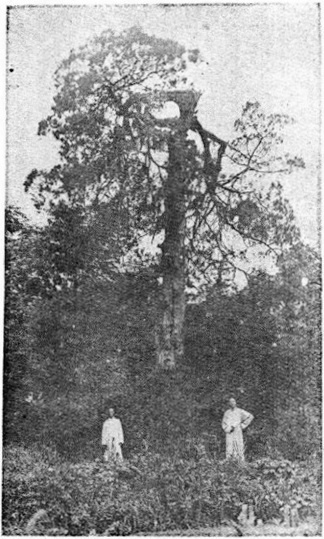
Tree in 1923

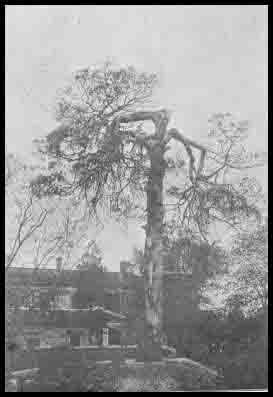
Tree in the 1930s

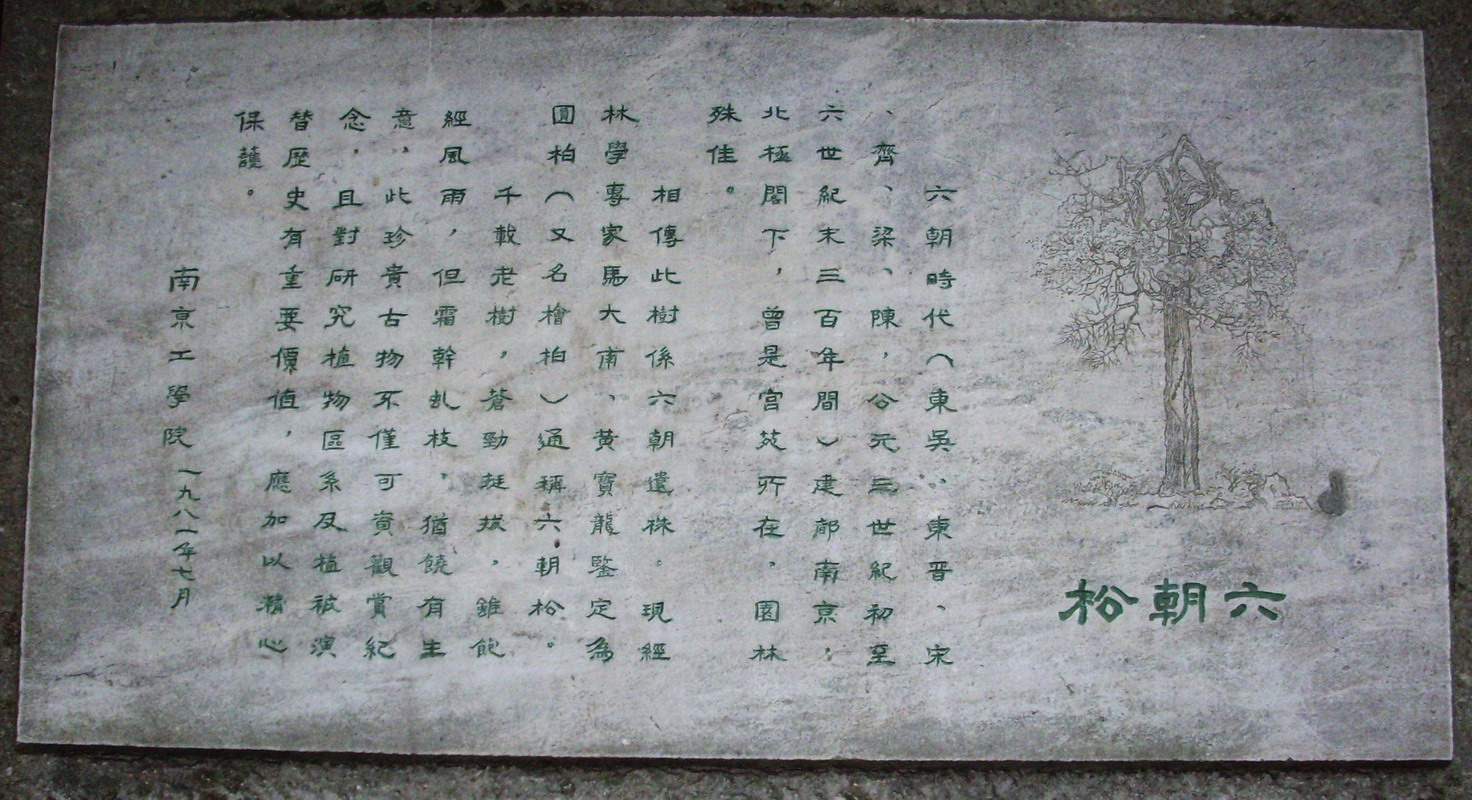
1981 stone marker

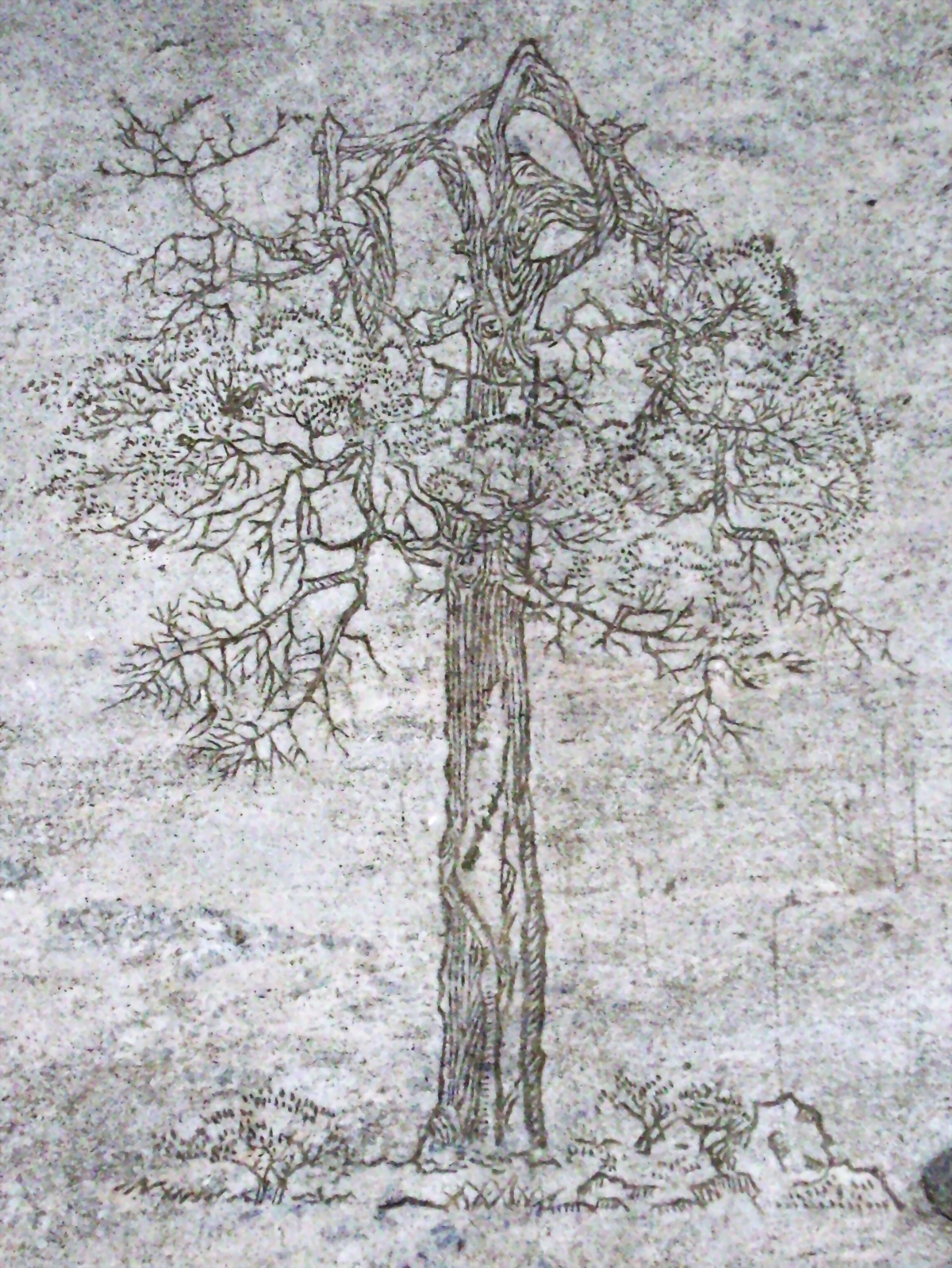
Detail of the engraving

== See also ==
- Southeast University
