= Xiaohe (crocodile) =

Famous saltwater crocodile

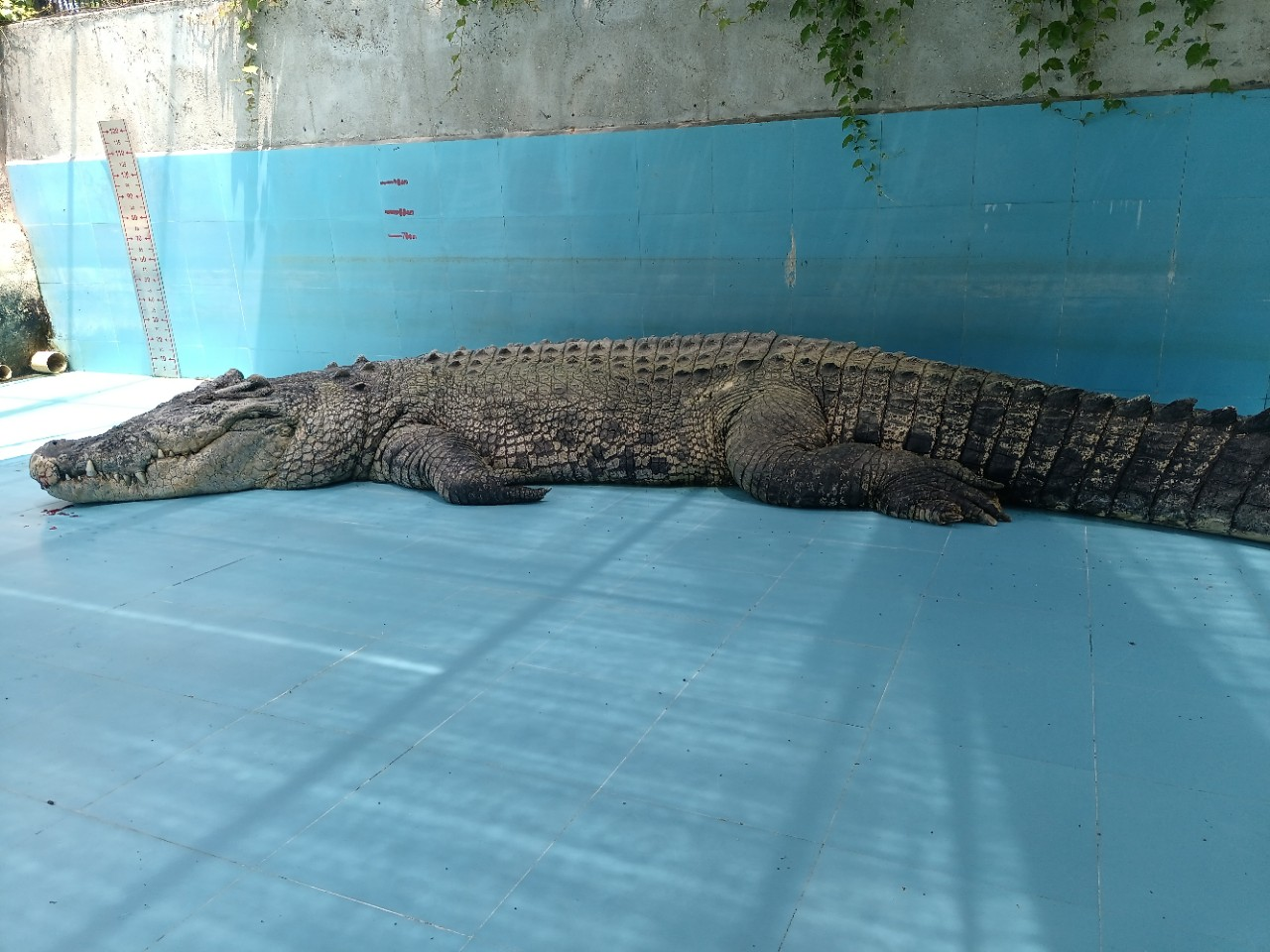
- May 2023 in Xiamen
- Species: Crocodylus porosus
- Sex: Male
- Hatched: August 1982; Singapore
- Died: 25 October 2023 (aged 41); Xiang'an District, Xiamen
- Known for: Largest crocodile raised in captivity
- Residence: Madou Crocodile King Farm of Ecological Education, Madou District, Tainan (1982~2017); Zhongfei-Shiye Wildlife Park, Xiang'an District, Xiamen (2017~2023)
- Weight: 750 kg (1650 lb) (before 2010 in Tainan); 900 kg (2,000 lb) (possible maximum mass at his arrival to Xiamen)

Xiaohe (Chinese: 小河; pinyin: Xiǎohé, 1982–2023) was the largest crocodile fully raised in captivity. He was a male saltwater crocodile who measured 5.2 m (17 ft) in length and may have weighed over 900 kg (2,000 lb). He lived in a crocodile farm in Tainan, Taiwan, for 34 years, and was moved to a zoo in Xiamen in 2017 as a result of the new animal protection law.

== Hatching and name ==
Xiaohe was hatched in August 1982 in Singapore and brought to Madou Crocodile King Farm of Ecological Education (麻豆鱷魚王生態教育農場) in Tainan the same year. Chiu Hsi-ho (Chinese: 邱錫河), the owner of the crocodile farm who claimed to have treated Xiaohe as his own child since he was just 30 cm (12 in) long, named him after the last character in his name, "河".

== Life in Tainan ==
Xiaohe grows to be the star at Madou Crocodile King as not only the largest crocodile in Taiwan, but also the largest crocodile in the world that is fully raised in captivity. During his life in Madou, his most well known measurements are 5.2 m (17 ft) in length and 1250 catty in mass, which is approximately 750 kg (1,650 lb). Some emphasize that these measurements are from before 2010 when Xiaohe's length was below 5 m (16 ft), and it is certain that he was much bigger when he left Madou in 2017. Several other specimens in captivity such as Lolong and Cassius are considerably larger, but were all captured after growing to their adult size in the wild and is reasonable to reach a larger size.

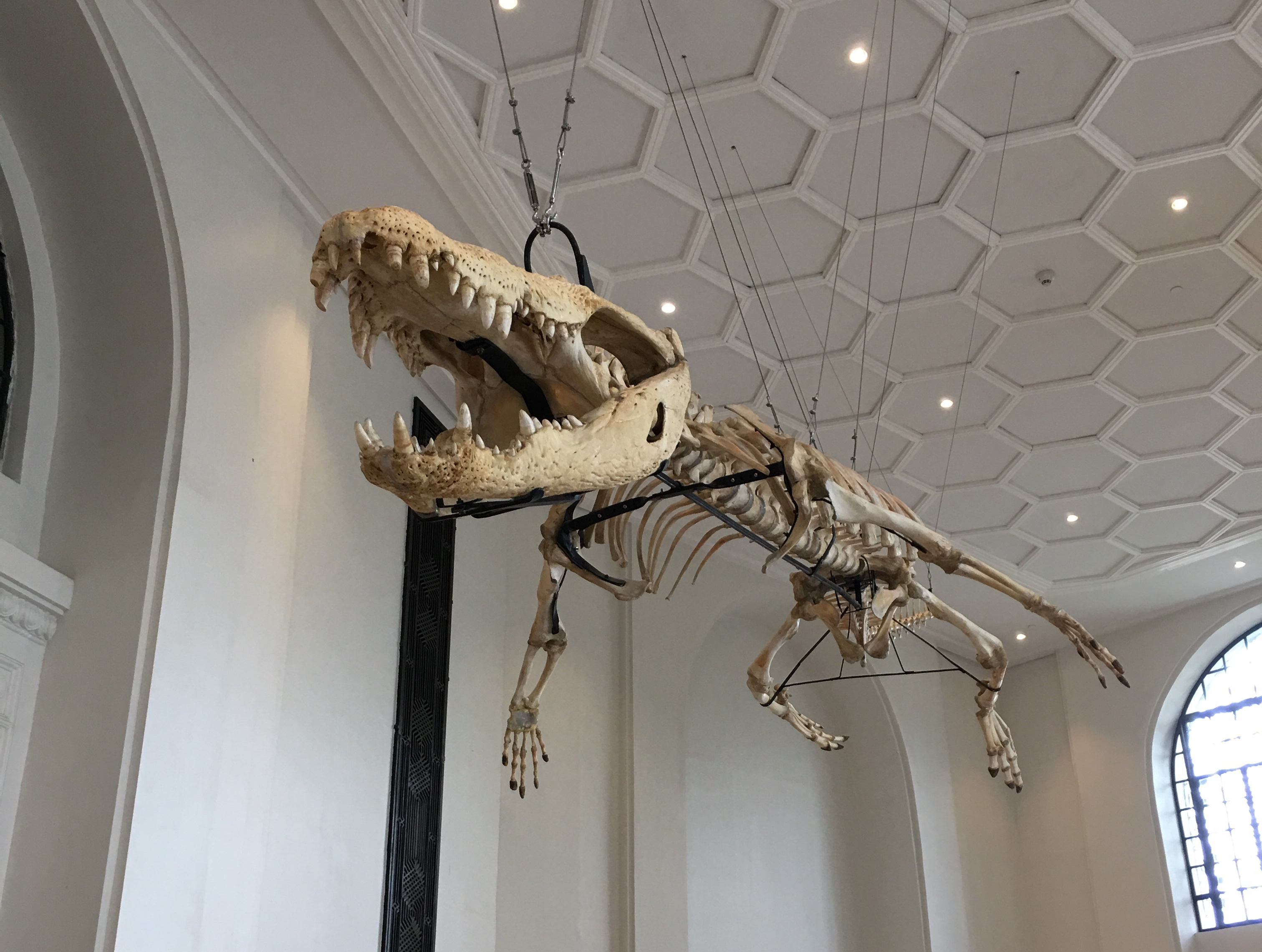
Skeleton of the Lolong, the largest crocodile specimen ever measured, at Philippine National Museum

Despite being "monstrous" as many claim, Xiaohe was quite docile, especially for a crocodile. This is best seen when Chiu Hsi-ho was able to do a dental extraction for him without using anesthetics, shortly after he was transported to Xiamen. At Madou Crocodile King, Chiu is seen regularly touching Xiaohe without receiving any injuries through the decades, and tourists that have photos with him are in the thousands. In 2015, local animal right groups listed Madou Crocodile King as "among the 10 worst farms in Taiwan" for organizing animal performances. On July 24, Chiu announced that the crocodile farm will permanently close on July 31, 2016 due to restrictions of the new Animal Protection Law. Many local residents and tourists came to say goodbye to Xiaohe that day. Chiu planned to send Xiaohe to mainland, because his ancestral land is Fujian, he choose to send Xiaohe to Xiamen Zhongfei-Shiye Wildlife Park (厦门中非世野野生动物园; 'Xiamen Central African World Wild Safari Zoo') within a month, but Xiaohe was prohibited from being transported to Mainland China until Chiu Hsi-ho provided proof that Xiaohe, as a saltwater crocodile, is not within the List of protected species. Chiu claims that the main reason he chose to send Xiaohe to Zhongfei-Shiye is because it is the only zoo in Xiamen, his ancestral home. He designed Xiaohe's exhibition at Zhongfei-Shiye, which was much larger than the one in Tainan. Although he did expressed his sadness for Xiaohe's leaving, Chiu has also shown great hope for Xiaohe's life in his new home.

== Life in Xiamen ==
=== Arrival ===
Xiaohe arrived at Zhongfei-Shiye on December 22, 2017, and was placed into his exhibit two days later. From measuring an approximate digital model, some enthusiasts claim that Xiaohe, on the day of his arrival, may have exceeded 900 kg (2,000 lb) in mass. However, his life in Zhongfei-Shiye turned out very disappointing. On October 31, 2018, a group of visitors threw bricks at him to "see if he was alive", inflicting impact wounds on his neck. Due to the lack of surveillance, the perpetrator has not yet been found. Similar injuries have been inflicted repetitively by many other visitors. In the following years, he rapidly lost weight every winter, primarily due to the complete lack of temperature regulation. Additionally, zookeepers at Zhongfei-Shiye mistakenly thought that crocodiles like Xiaohe hibernate in the winter, therefore not feeding him any food in the winter months.

=== Public attention ===
In December 2022, several detailed videos on Bilibili reveals that Xiaohe is suffering from severe malnutrition, with the shape of his mandibles, scapulae and vertebral spines being clearly visible from his body frame. In addition, Zhongfei-Shiye's underwhelming water quality is also stopping his injuries from healing, as well as causing infection. Many criticisms rose across the internet regarding Zhongfei-Shiye's mistreatment for Xiaohe, describing the acts of the zoo as "abuses" while comparing these conditions with that of Lolong before his death.

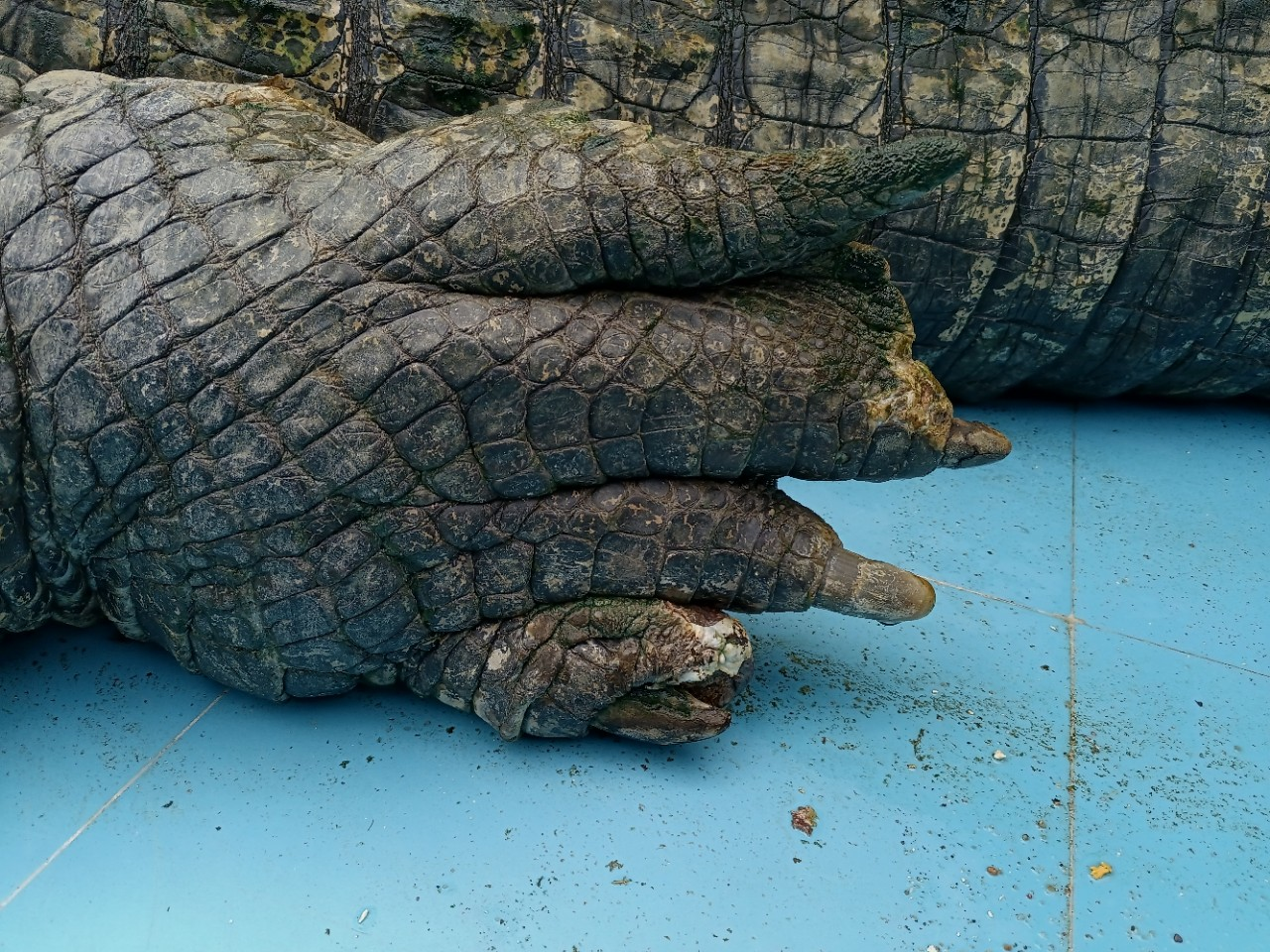
Xiaohe's infected left foot

A few days later, the temperature in Xiamen dropped rapidly. On December 18, many enthusiasts gathered at Zhongfei-Shiye to provide temperature-regulating devices for the zoo, in fear that Xiaohe might die if the low temperature would cause core body functions to fail. At last, the enthusiasts were able to test Xiaohe's body temperature with permission from the Ministry of Water Resources and make sure that his metabolism is at a normal level. Meanwhile, many netizens reported the conditions of Xiaohe to local government officials in attempt to interfere the situation. Responses from the Forestry Administration and the Water Resources Administration turned out disappointing, some even accusing these netizens of carrying an anti-government political agenda. Meanwhile, all responses from Zhongfei-Shiye claims that Xiaohe is "healthy and well fed", even falsely claiming that his weight is "2.6 tonnes". In contrast, the Ministry of Agriculture and Rural Affairs responded by enforcing Zhongfei-Shiye to improve the exhibits of all animals in the zoo within the following months, including Xiaohe.

=== Medical treatment and death ===
In March 2023, enthusiasts noticed that Xiaohe had lost weight in just days. His health conditions deteriorated rapidly in the following month, being seen many times to not move for entire days. Noticing the dangerous conditions Xiaohe was in, enthusiasts discussed and organized a temporary treatment which would take place in early May. Chiu Chien-wen (邱建文), Chiu Hsi-ho's son and an experienced crocodilian herpetologist, arrived on May 1 to assist in the treatment. On May 8, Zhongfei-Shiye's vet, with the assistance of Chiu Chien-wen and several enthusiasts, did a blood test for Xiaohe, revealing that Xiaohe's liver and kidneys were severely damaged, which would require further treatment in the following months. Two enthusiasts measured his size in preparation for medical injection on the same day with the following results:

Method of measurement	Result
Total length (measured along the centra)	5.45 m (17.9 ft)
Total length (measured snout-tail, vaires due to body pose)	5.3–5.4 m (17–18 ft)
Snout-vent length (measured snout-sacrum)	2.75 m (9 ft 0 in)
Cranium length (measured premaxilla-parietal)	60–65 cm (24–26 in)
Volume (estimated by modeling, varies due to breathing)	0.58–0.61 m^{3} (20–22 cu ft)
Mass (estimated by modeling, density = 0.98-1.028 g/cm^{3})	~600 kg (1,300 lb)

Xiaohe's conditions improved in the few weeks following the injection, and he resumed some of his physical power, but was still suffering from bacterial infection constantly damaging his skin. In addition, he still struggled to consume the necessary amount of food to regain his weight and be prepared for the coming winter.

Xiaohe died on October 25, 2023, around 18:00 due to health problems.
