= Xiaohu Yu =

Xiaohu Yu from the Southeast University, Nanjing, Jiangsu, China was named Fellow of the Institute of Electrical and Electronics Engineers (IEEE) in 2012 for leadership in the development of mobile communications in China.
