= Lao Lang =

Chinese folk singer (born 1968)

Lao Lang 老狼
- Born: Wang Yang (王阳); December 3, 1968 (age 57)
- Origin: Beijing, China
- Genres: Folk, Pop
- Occupation: Singer
- Years active: 1991–present

Wang Yang (Chinese: 王阳, born 3 December 1968), known professionally as Lao Lang (Chinese: 老狼; pinyin: Lǎo Láng; lit. 'Old Wolf'), is a Chinese folk and pop singer.

He is widely recognized as a central figure in the "Campus Folk" (校园民谣) movement in Mainland China that defined the Chinese music landscape in the 1990s.

== Early life ==
Lao Lang was born in Beijing, China. He studied wireless communications in college and worked as an engineer before pursuing a full-time career in music in the early 1990s. During this period, he began his long-time artistic collaboration with songwriter Gao Xiaosong.

== Career ==
Lao Lang rose to prominence in the mid-1990s with the song "My Deskmate" (同桌的你), written by Gao, which became widely popular in China.

He is commonly associated with the campus folk music movement, a genre that became popular among university students in China during the 1990s.

=== Television appearances and competition ===
In 2016, he competed in the fourth season of the singing competition Singer (known as I Am a Singer at the time).

He later appeared in the music travelogue series Singing While Walking (边走边唱) and served as a mentor and performer on the folk music reality show Our Folk Songs 2022 (我们民谣2022), focusing on the inheritance of folk music traditions.

=== Recent activity ===
As of 2026, Lao Lang continues to perform at music festivals and concerts in China and abroad.

In March 2025, Lao Lang launched The Age of Innocence Tour (纯真年代), with performances across mainland China and international venues in North America and Oceania.

== Discography ==
Information adapted from official streaming platform listings.

- 1995 – Lovers in the Blue (恋恋风尘)
- 2002 – Looking for Lao Lang (晴朗)
- 2007 – Songs from the Past (北京的冬天)
