= Memorial Day (disambiguation) =

Memorial Day is an American holiday.

Memorial Day may also refer to:

== Commemorative days ==
- Armenian Memorial Day or Armenian Genocide Remembrance Day
- Memorial Day (Azerbaijan)
- In China:
  - Qingming Festival
  - Nanjing Massacre Memorial Day
  - Martyrs' Day (China)
- Memorial Day (Israel) or Yom Hazikaron
- Memorial Day (Newfoundland and Labrador)
- Memorial Day (South Korea)
- Memorial Day (Ukraine)
- Memorial Day (Turkmenistan)
- Confederate Memorial Day, an observance in the Southern U.S. that began in 1866
- Peace Memorial Day, a public holiday in Taiwan

== Film ==
- Memorial Day (1983 film)
- Memorial Day (1998 film), a film starring Stephanie Niznik
- Memorial Day (1999 film)
- Memorial Day (2012 film)

== Other uses ==
- Memorial Day (novel), a 2004 novel by Vince Flynn
- Memorial Day (album), an album by Full Blooded
- "Memorial Day" (The West Wing), an episode of The West Wing
- Memorial Day Handicap, an American Thoroughbred horse race
- "Memorial Day", a 1979 song by Carly Simon from Spy
