= The Five Martyrs =

The Five Martyrs may refer to:

- Five Martyrs of Shia Islam, five Shia Muslims executed by Sunni Muslims in different periods.
- Five Martyrs of the League of Left-Wing Writers, five left-wing Chinese writers executed by the Kuomintang on 7 February 1931
- Five heroes of Langyashan, five Chinese soldiers and martyrs during the Second Sino-Japanese War according to the Chinese Communist Party
