= Law on the Protection of Heroes and Martyrs =

2018 law of the People's Republic of China

Heroes and Martyrs Protection Law

Standing Committee of the National People's Congress
- Long title: Law of the People's Republic of China on the Protection of Heroes and Martyrs 中华人民共和国英雄烈士保护法
- Citation: Order of the President No. 5 (2018)
- Territorial extent: People's Republic of China
- Passed by: 13th Standing Committee of the National People's Congress (2nd session)
- Passed: 27 April 2018
- Signed by: President Xi Jinping
- Signed: 27 April 2018
- Commenced: 1 May 2018

Legislative history
- Introduced by: Council of Chairpersons
- Introduced: 14 December 2017
- First reading: 22 December 2017
- Second reading: 27 April 2018
- Voting summary: 170 voted for; None voted against; None abstained

Related legislation
- Civil Code, art. 185; Criminal Law, art. 299-1
- Status: In force

Law of the People's Republic of China on the Protection of Heroes and Martyrs
- Simplified Chinese: 中华人民共和国英雄烈士保护法
- Traditional Chinese: 中華人民共和國英雄烈士保護法
Transcriptions
Standard Mandarin
- Hanyu Pinyin: Zhōnghuá Rénmín Gònghéguó Yīngxióng Lièshì Bǎohù Fǎ

Alternative Chinese name
- Simplified Chinese: 英烈保护法
- Traditional Chinese: 英烈保護法
- Literal meaning: Heroes and Martyrs Protection Law
Transcriptions
Standard Mandarin
- Hanyu Pinyin: Yīngliè Bǎohù Fǎ

The Law of the People's Republic of China on the Protection of Heroes and Martyrs (Chinese: 中华人民共和国英雄烈士保护法), commonly shortened to the Heroes and Martyrs Protection Law (英烈保护法), is a statute of the People's Republic of China that regulates the commemoration of officially recognised heroes and martyrs and protects their names, likenesses, reputations and honours against defamation, distortion and commercial exploitation. It was adopted unanimously by the Standing Committee of the National People's Congress (NPCSC) on 27 April 2018, promulgated by Presidential Order No. 5, and entered into force on 1 May 2018. The law comprises thirty articles.

The statute combines two functions that are usually handled separately in other legal systems. On the one hand it is a law of commemoration: it gives statutory form to Martyrs' Day on 30 September, confers special legal status on the Monument to the People's Heroes in Tiananmen Square, and imposes duties on governments, schools, the media and Chinese diplomatic missions abroad to maintain memorials and transmit the "deeds and spirit" of heroes and martyrs. On the other hand it is a law of speech regulation: it prohibits the "distortion, vilification, desecration or denial" of those deeds and that spirit, authorises procuratorates to bring public-interest litigation where a martyr has no close relatives willing to sue, and provides a framework for administrative and criminal sanctions. Its criminal dimension was substantially sharpened by the Eleventh Amendment to the Criminal Law (2020), which created a stand-alone offence of infringing the reputation and honour of heroes and martyrs, punishable by up to three years' imprisonment.

Official accounts present the law as a defence of the public interest and of "the common historical memory of the Chinese nation" against historical nihilism. Scholars of comparative memory laws and human-rights organisations have treated it as a central component of an expanding body of Chinese legislation that juridifies historical memory, and have raised concerns about its effects on historical research, journalism and artistic expression.

== Background ==
=== Protection of the reputation of the deceased ===
Chinese law did not originally contain an express rule on the personality interests of deceased persons. The Supreme People's Court (SPC) first recognised in a 1989 reply concerning the late performer known as "Lotus Girl" (荷花女) that the reputation of a deceased person remained protected and that her close relatives had standing to sue; later judicial interpretations, notably the 2001 interpretation on damages for emotional harm, generalised the principle to the name, likeness, reputation and honour of the dead. Under this regime, however, protection was essentially private: it depended on the existence and willingness of close relatives, and it did not distinguish the reputation of a national hero from that of any other deceased person.

=== The "Five heroes of Langya Mountain" litigation ===
The most significant precursor to the law was a pair of civil suits concerning the Five Heroes of Langya Mountain, a group of Eighth Route Army soldiers celebrated in school textbooks for leaping from a cliff rather than surrendering to Japanese forces in 1941. In 2013 Hong Zhenkuai, a former executive editor of the liberal historical monthly Yanhuang Chunqiu, published two articles questioning details of the canonical account. Sons of two of the soldiers sued him in 2015 for infringing their fathers' reputation and honour. On 27 June 2016 the Xicheng District People's Court in Beijing found for the plaintiffs and ordered Hong to publish an apology. The court held that the articles, although free of insulting language, had used speculative and inadequately evidenced questioning of peripheral details to cast doubt on the main facts and thereby diminish the heroes' image and "spiritual value"; it further held that the Five Heroes had become "part of the common memory of the Chinese nation" and an important source of socialist core values, so that damage to their reputation also damaged the public interest. The court expressly addressed, and subordinated, Hong's appeal to academic freedom and freedom of expression. His appeal was rejected in August 2016; Hong described the case as political and said he would not apologise, characterising his work as an exercise of "basic academic freedom". In the same year a Beijing court ordered an internet commentator and a beverage company to apologise to the family of the Korean War soldier Qiu Shaoyun over mocking social-media posts.

The reasoning of the Langya Mountain judgments—that a hero's individual reputation is fused with a collective public interest, and that "denial" of the core narrative can be tortious even without insult or proven falsity—was later carried into the statute. The legislature's own interpretive materials cite the Langya Mountain and Qiu Shaoyun cases as typical examples of conduct that, "in the name of 'academic freedom', 'restoring history' and 'exploring details'", had "vilified, defamed, belittled and questioned" heroes and martyrs, and characterise such conduct as in substance an attempt to undermine the Chinese Communist Party's governing foundation and the socialist system.

=== Martyrs' Day and Article 185 of the General Provisions of the Civil law ===
On 31 August 2014 the NPCSC designated 30 September—the anniversary of the laying of the foundation stone of the Monument to the People's Heroes—as Martyrs' Day, on which the state holds commemorative activities. In March 2017 the National People's Congress adopted the General Provisions of the Civil Law, whose Article 185—inserted late in the drafting process at the suggestion of deputies—provides that anyone who infringes the name, likeness, reputation or honour of "heroes, martyrs and the like" and thereby harms the public interest shall bear civil liability. The provision was carried over unchanged as Article 185 of the Civil Code (2020).

== Legislative history ==
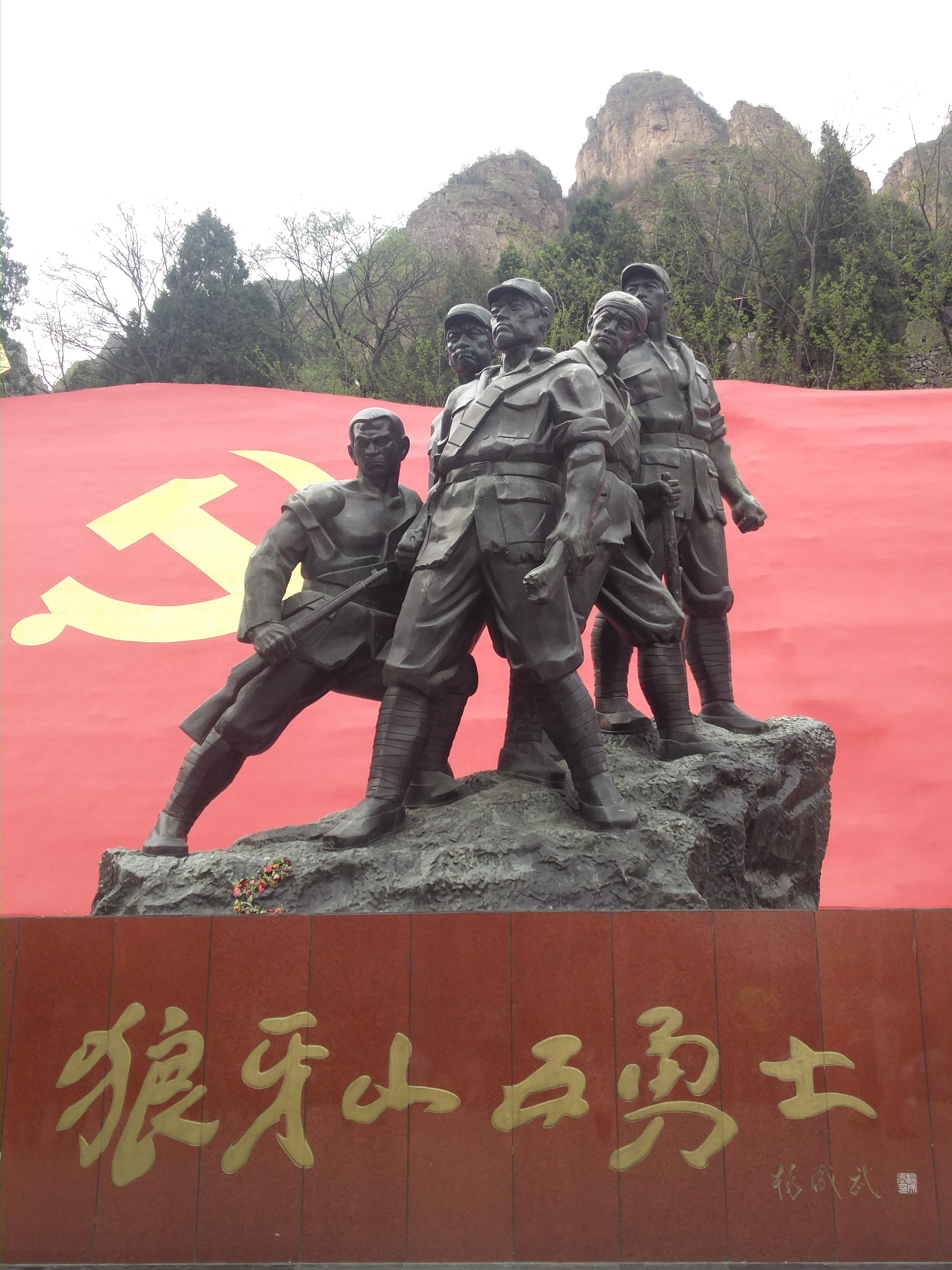
Statues of Five heroes of Langyashan at the foot of Mount Langya in Hebei Province, China.

Calls for dedicated legislation intensified after the Langya Mountain litigation; according to officials, 251 NPC deputies and CPPCC members submitted proposals or letters to that effect during the 2017 legislative sessions. A further impetus came from a series of incidents in 2017 and early 2018 in which young men photographed themselves in replica uniforms of the Japanese army at wartime sites in Shanghai and Nanjing and posted the images online; the media labelled such people jingri (精日, "spiritually Japanese"). On 8 March 2018, during the annual session of the National People's Congress, Foreign Minister Wang Yi answered a reporter's question on the subject by calling them "scum among the Chinese people". That afternoon, 38 members of the CPPCC from the arts sector, among them the historian He Yun'ao and the actor Jackie Chan, submitted a joint proposal for a dedicated law to protect "national dignity", arguing that existing law punished insults to the national flag, emblem and anthem but not the promotion of Japanese militarism or public insults to national heroes and revolutionary martyrs. The NPCSC placed the law on its 2017 work programme and formally launched the drafting procedure in July 2017, after Xi Jinping, as General Secretary of the Communist Party, had issued an instruction on heroes-and-martyrs legislation in April 2017. As part of the consultation, the LAC held a meeting in Nanchang on 23 October 2017 at which Fang Huaqing, the eldest grandson of the Communist martyr Fang Zhimin, described online attacks on his grandfather's reputation and criticised the relevant authorities for having failed for six or seven years to respond to them. Drafting was led by the NPCSC Legislative Affairs Commission (LAC) in a working group with the Central Propaganda Department, the Ministry of Civil Affairs, the Ministry of Human Resources and Social Security and the Legal Affairs Bureau of the Central Military Commission. The group held more than ten consultative meetings, conducted fieldwork in former revolutionary base areas and "hero units" of the army, consulted the Central Archives, examined pending cases at the Beijing High People's Court, and studied foreign legislation.

The draft was submitted by the Council of Chairpersons and received its first reading at the 31st session of the 12th NPCSC on 22 December 2017, when LAC deputy director Xu Anbiao (许安标) explained it to the committee. Xu told reporters that conduct which "vilifies, defames, belittles and questions" the heroes and martyrs of the Party and the army was in essence aimed at "shaking the governing foundation" of the Party and the socialist system, and therefore had to be clearly prohibited by law. The draft also clarified that the law would apply only to deceased heroes and martyrs; living heroic models were to remain under the Law on National Medals and National Honorary Titles and general law.

The bill was adopted at its second reading, at the 2nd session of the 13th NPCSC on 27 April 2018, by 170 votes to none with no abstentions, and signed into law by President Xi Jinping the same day. Among the changes made between the readings was an explicit provision penalising conduct that "promotes or glorifies wars of aggression and acts of aggression" (now Article 27(2)). Yue Zhongming (岳仲明), head of the LAC's legislative planning office, linked this to recent incidents in which young people had photographed themselves in Second World War Japanese military uniforms at memorial sites and posted the images online. The provision had been proposed by the NPCSC's Constitution and Law Committee for that purpose.

== Provisions ==
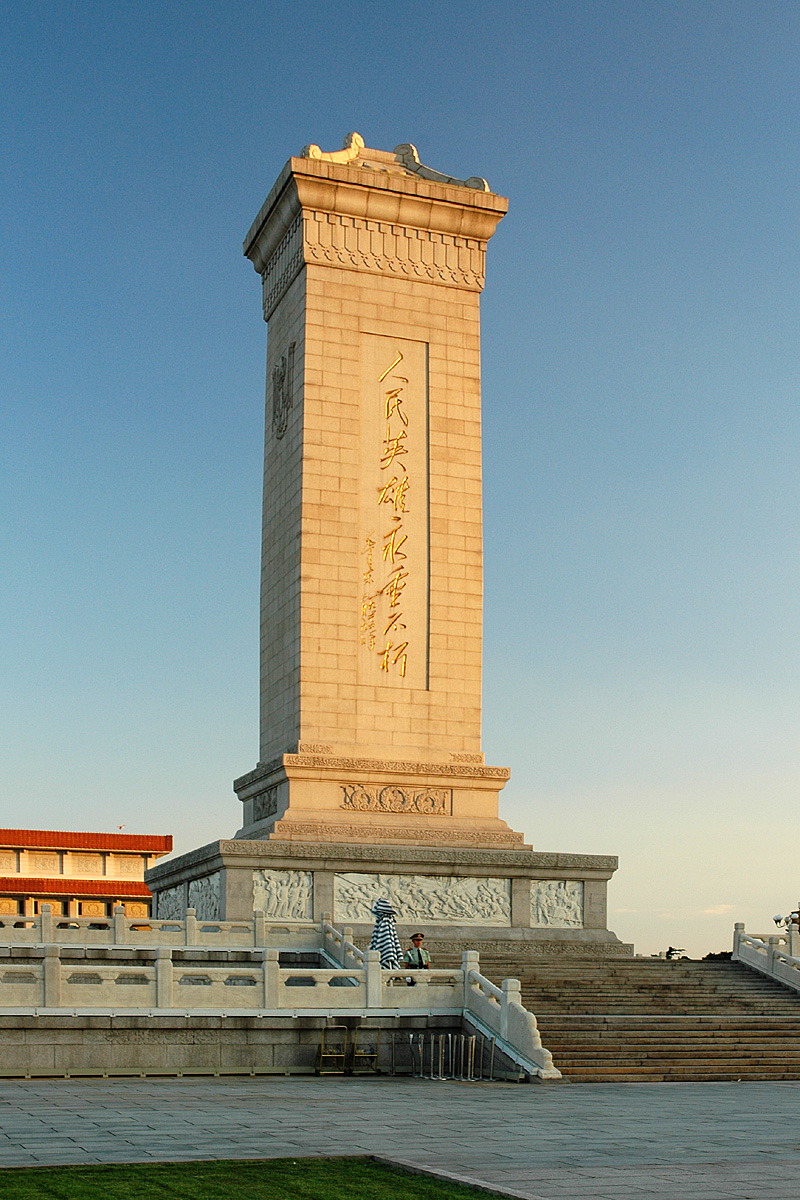
The Monument to the People's Heroes in Tiananmen Square, Beijing

The law is not divided into chapters, but its thirty articles fall into five functional groups.

=== Purpose and definition (articles 1–4) ===
Article 1 states the law's purposes: to strengthen the protection of heroes and martyrs, safeguard the public interest, transmit their spirit and the spirit of patriotism, cultivate the core socialist values, and generate "spiritual power" for the "Chinese Dream of the great rejuvenation of the Chinese nation". Article 2 defines its subject matter by reference to historical purpose rather than formal status: the heroes and martyrs who, "since modern times", struggled and sacrificed themselves "for national independence and the liberation of the people, for national prosperity and the happiness of the people, and for world peace and human progress". The formula echoes the inscription on the Monument to the People's Heroes and the Preamble to the Constitution. Article 3 declares that the deeds and spirit of heroes and martyrs constitute "the common historical memory of the Chinese nation" and an important embodiment of the core socialist values, and that "the whole of society" should revere, learn from and defend them. Article 4 allocates responsibilities to governments at all levels and to the armed forces and requires county-level and higher governments to budget for the work.

=== Commemoration and memorial sites (articles 5–14) ===
Article 5 incorporates Martyrs' Day into statute and requires a national ceremony before the Monument to the People's Heroes each 30 September. Article 7 describes the Monument as the symbol of the Chinese people's struggle since modern times and extends legal protection to its name, inscriptions, reliefs, images and emblems—the first time the Monument's legal status was fixed by statute. Articles 8–10 require memorials to be integrated into economic and urban planning, listed as protected cultural relics where appropriate, opened to the public free of charge, and kept in a "solemn, dignified and tranquil" condition; activities that detract from that atmosphere, encroachment on memorial land, and damage to memorials are prohibited. Articles 11–13 regulate burial and commemorative rites, including online commemoration. Article 14 extends these duties abroad: Chinese diplomatic and consular missions are to organise commemoration at martyrs' graves in their host states, and the state is to cooperate with foreign governments to locate remains and restore memorials.

=== Research, education and culture (articles 15–20) ===
The memorial hall for Battle of Pingxingguan, with facilities of national education majorly for students.

Article 15 encourages research into heroes and martyrs but directs that history be understood and recorded under the guidance of dialectical materialism and historical materialism. Article 17 makes heroes and martyrs a compulsory component of the national education system, with young students as the principal focus. Articles 18–19 require cultural, press, broadcasting, film and cyberspace authorities, and media and internet service providers, to promote works on these themes, including through public-service advertising. Article 20 grants tax benefits for donations.

=== Benefits for survivors (Article 21) ===
Article 21 establishes a system of pensions and preferential treatment for the surviving families of heroes and martyrs in education, employment, old-age care, housing and medical care, to be raised in line with economic development.

=== Protection of reputation and liability (articles 22–29) ===
Article 22, the law's central speech provision, has three paragraphs. The first prohibits "distorting, vilifying, desecrating or denying the deeds and spirit of heroes and martyrs". The second protects their name, likeness, reputation and honour, prohibits infringement "by insult, defamation or other means" in public places, on the internet or in broadcasts, films and publications, and bars the use of their names or likenesses in trademarks or commercial advertising in a manner that damages their reputation. The third directs public-security, cultural, press, broadcasting, film, cyberspace and market-regulation authorities to deal with violations.

Article 23 imposes duties on network operators: they must immediately stop the transmission of infringing content posted by users, delete it, preserve records and report to the authorities, failing which they are liable under the Cybersecurity Law; for such content originating outside the PRC, the authorities are to have "technical measures" taken to block its dissemination. Article 24 gives any organisation or individual a right to report violations.

Article 25 establishes the procedural architecture. Close relatives of a hero or martyr may sue; if there are no close relatives, or they decline to sue, the procuratorate "shall" bring suit against infringements that harm the public interest. Administrative departments that discover infringements must report them to the procuratorate, and legal-aid institutions must assist relatives who sue. Officials described this as the establishment of a dedicated public-interest litigation regime for infringements of the reputation and honour of heroes and martyrs.

Articles 26–29 set out liability. Article 26 provides that infringement of a hero's or martyr's name, likeness, reputation or honour that harms the public interest attracts civil liability, administrative detention or fines under the Public Security Administration Punishments Law, or criminal liability where a crime is constituted. Article 27(1) addresses disruptive conduct at memorial sites; Article 27(2) provides for public-security penalties or criminal liability for "desecrating or denying the deeds and spirit of heroes and martyrs, or promoting or glorifying wars of aggression and acts of aggression", where such conduct amounts to picking quarrels and provoking trouble or disturbs public order. Article 28 deals with damage to memorials and Article 29 with official misconduct. The law entered into force on 1 May 2018 (Article 30).

== Related legislation and implementing instruments ==
=== Civil Code, Article 185 ===
Article 185 of the Civil Code, inherited from the 2017 General Provisions, supplies the substantive civil-law basis on which courts have assessed liability in suits under the Heroes and Martyrs Protection Law; courts have routinely cited the two provisions together. In 2018 the SPC instructed lower courts to accept suits by relatives and by procuratorates promptly and to determine liability on the basis of the General Provisions, the Tort Liability Law and the new statute.

=== Criminal law, Article 299-1 ===
As enacted, the 2018 law created no offence of its own; Articles 26 and 27 merely referred to criminal liability "where a crime is constituted". In practice, prosecutors initially relied on general offences, especially picking quarrels and provoking trouble, which carries a maximum sentence of five years. Amendment XI to the Criminal Law, adopted by the NPCSC on 26 December 2020 and in force from 1 March 2021, inserted a new Article 299-1: whoever insults, defames or otherwise infringes the reputation or honour of heroes and martyrs, harming the public interest, where the circumstances are serious, is punishable by fixed-term imprisonment of not more than three years, criminal detention, public surveillance or deprivation of political rights. The offence is placed immediately after Article 299 (desecration of the national flag, emblem and anthem), within the section of the Criminal Law on disrupting public order, rather than beside the general offences of insult and defamation (Article 246) among the offences against personal rights.

=== Joint Opinions of 2022 ===
In 2022 the SPC, the Supreme People's Procuratorate and the Ministry of Public Security jointly issued Opinions on Punishing Violations and Crimes Infringing the Reputation and Honour of Heroes and Martyrs (Gongtongzi [2022] No. 5). The Opinions define the protected class by reference to Article 2 of the 2018 law, specify that its temporal core is "since modern times" with emphasis on heroes and martyrs "in the history of the Chinese Communist Party, the people's army and the People's Republic of China", and extend it to groups and to unnamed heroes. Persons officially rated as martyrs are always covered; deceased persons not so rated may be covered if their deeds and spirit are "generally acknowledged" by society. Living heroic models are excluded and remain protected by the ordinary offences of insult and defamation, except where a group includes both deceased and living members. Whether circumstances are "serious" is to be assessed holistically—by reference to the manner of the conduct, the number of heroes affected, and the reach and duration of dissemination—with the 2013 judicial interpretation on online defamation (which treats 5,000 views or 500 reposts as a benchmark for seriousness) applicable by analogy where necessary.

=== Overseas memorials ===
The extraterritorial dimension of Article 14 was implemented by the Measures on the Protection and Administration of Martyrs' Memorial Facilities Abroad, promulgated on 1 February 2020 by the Ministry of Veterans Affairs, the Ministry of Foreign Affairs, the Ministry of Finance and the Political Work Department of the Central Military Commission, and in force from 1 April 2020. According to the Ministry, some 180 memorial facilities in 27 countries hold the remains of about 110,000 Chinese martyrs.

== Enforcement and case law ==
=== Civil and public-interest litigation ===
The first application of the law came within weeks of its entry into force. On 12 May 2018 Xie Yong (谢勇), a firefighter, died while rescuing residents from a high-rise fire in Huai'an, Jiangsu, and was posthumously recognised as a martyr. Two days later a local man, Zeng Yun, posted remarks in a WeChat group attributing Xie's death to his own "operational error" and deriding his heroism. After Xie's relatives declared that they would not sue, the Huai'an Municipal Procuratorate filed a civil public-interest suit on 21 May; on 12 June 2018 the Huai'an Intermediate People's Court found that Zeng had infringed the martyr's reputation and harmed the public interest, and ordered him to apologise publicly in a local newspaper (case no. (2018) Su 08 Min Gong Chu No. 1). The SPC later selected the case as one of ten typical civil cases promoting the core socialist values, characterising it as the judicial protection of "the public interest embodied in the personality interests of heroes and martyrs".

Relatives had begun to rely on Article 185 of the General Provisions even before the statute took effect. On 2 April 2018 the People's Court of Yiyang County, Jiangxi, mediated a suit brought by Fang Huaqing against two individuals who had defamed Fang Zhimin and the soldiers of the Red Army's 10th Corps; the defendants apologised in person and in writing, and Fang waived his claim for damages. The case was reported as the first successful suit to protect a martyr's reputation under Article 185. Suits by relatives have also continued. On 28 September 2018 the Yanta District People's Court in Xi'an held that a video by the online comedy brand Baozou Manhua parodying the "Prisoner's Song" written in captivity by the revolutionary general Ye Ting had infringed his reputation and the public interest, and ordered the operating company to apologise in national media and pay the plaintiffs 100,000 yuan in compensation for emotional harm.

According to the Supreme People's Procuratorate, between 2018 and 2022 procuratorates handled nearly one hundred civil public-interest cases concerning infringement of heroes' and martyrs' names, likenesses, reputations and honour, of which more than sixty were brought to court. Over the same period they opened more than 8,000 administrative public-interest cases concerning inadequate protection of memorial facilities, filing more than fifty suits and prompting the repair of over 23,000 memorial sites.

=== Administrative enforcement ===
Graves of heroes and martyrs are obligated to be maintained, including restoration if necessary, by the local government.

Regulators have applied the law directly against platforms. On 12 October 2021, the anniversary of the death of the Korean War soldier Qiu Shaoyun, the antivirus program Kingsoft Duba pushed a pop-up article illustrated with an image of him under the headline "A sinister villain written into textbooks as a hero". Three days later the Beijing cyberspace authority summoned the operator, Beijing Cheetah Network Technology, ordered it to suspend its pop-up news function for thirty days, and opened an administrative penalty case under the Heroes and Martyrs Protection Law and the Cybersecurity Law.

Police have also used administrative and criminal detention against individual social-media posts about the dead. After 27 forest firefighters and three local people were killed fighting the Muli forest fire in Sichuan on 31 March 2019, a 30-year-old man who had posted insulting remarks about them on Baidu was arrested in Jinjiang and detained on suspicion of picking quarrels and provoking trouble. In May 2021 Tianjin police took "criminal compulsory measures" against a man who had insulted the agronomist Yuan Longping in a WeChat post on the day of his death; the police statement invoked the principle that heroes and martyrs "must not be desecrated", although Yuan had not been rated a martyr. In October 2021 the police in Nanchang imposed ten days' administrative detention on a Weibo user who had written that the greatest achievement of the Korean War was "egg fried rice", an allusion to a widely circulated account that Mao Anying was killed in a 1950 American air raid after lighting a fire in camp to cook the dish.

=== Criminal prosecutions ===
The first conviction under Article 299-1 concerned the investigative blogger Qiu Ziming (仇子明), whose Weibo account "Labi Xiaoqiu" (辣笔小球) had about 2.5 million followers. On 19 February 2021—the day the authorities first disclosed that four Chinese soldiers had died in the June 2020 clash in the Galwan Valley—Qiu posted two messages questioning the official account. He was initially detained on suspicion of picking quarrels and provoking trouble; after Amendment XI entered into force he was charged instead under the new offence, which carries a lower maximum penalty. He made a televised confession on CCTV. On 31 May 2021 the Jianye District People's Court in Nanjing, hearing a combined criminal prosecution and incidental civil public-interest action, sentenced him to eight months' imprisonment and ordered him to apologise through major national portals and media within ten days.

In a second prominent case, the journalist Luo Changping posted on Weibo on 6 October 2021, after watching the film The Battle at Lake Changjin, a comment mocking the "ice sculpture company" of Chinese People's Volunteers who froze to death at the Battle of Chosin Reservoir. The post was removed by the platform within thirty minutes after being read 22,397 times. On 5 May 2022 the Chengjiao People's Court in Sanya, Hainan, sentenced Luo to seven months' imprisonment and ordered public apologies on Sina, the Legal Daily and the PLA Daily; the court took account of his voluntary surrender, his guilty plea and his payment of 80,000 yuan in public-interest damages to the War to Resist US Aggression and Aid Korea Memorial in Dandong.

The heaviest publicised sentence to date was imposed on the artist Gao Zhen of the Gao Brothers, who had lived in New York since 2012 and is known for satirical sculptures of Mao Zedong. Taken into custody in August 2024, he was tried at a one-day hearing closed to the public in March 2026 and, on 25 August 2026, sentenced by the Sanhe City People's Court in Hebei to three years' imprisonment—the statutory maximum—for sculptures of Mao made between 2005 and 2009. He has decided to appeal. In his closing statement, published by Human Rights in China, Gao argued that the prosecution had departed from the customary sentencing practice in comparable cases, which he said typically produced terms of under a year, because the case concerned a "high-ranking" revolutionary figure. Amnesty International said that the law had been used "retroactively" against him; Reuters noted that some of the works dated from as early as 2005, some sixteen years before the criminal offence was created.

== Analysis and reception ==
=== Doctrinal character ===
The law's most distinctive doctrinal feature is its treatment of a deceased individual's reputation as simultaneously a private personality interest and a collective public good. This construction, first articulated in the Langya Mountain judgments, underlies both the procuratorate's standing under Article 25 and the requirement in Article 26, Civil Code Article 185 and Criminal Law Article 299-1 that the infringement "harm the public interest". A corollary, visible in the Langya Mountain reasoning, is that liability does not depend on insulting language or on proof that a statement is false: selective or speculative questioning that tends to "deny" the principal narrative may suffice. The inclusion in Article 15 of a prescribed interpretive method for historical research, and in Article 22 of a prohibition on "denying" the deeds and spirit of heroes and martyrs, has accordingly been read as extending the law beyond the protection of individual reputation into the regulation of historical interpretation.

A further structural feature is the breadth and partial indeterminacy of the protected class. Article 2 defines it by historical purpose rather than by an exhaustive list, and the 2022 Opinions extend it to persons never formally rated as martyrs whose deeds are "generally acknowledged". The Dui Hua Foundation, citing reporting by The Wall Street Journal, noted that the official martyrs' database contains more than two million names, and questioned whether the public can know which historical figures fall within the law's protection.

=== Official and domestic perspectives ===
Official sources describe the law as a necessary measure to defend the public interest, foster patriotism and the core socialist values, and counter historical nihilism, and emphasise its commemorative and welfare provisions as much as its sanctions. On its adoption, a Xinhua feature said that by punishing desecration of heroes and martyrs, identifying who is responsible for protecting them and strengthening education about their deeds, the law completed a legal system that "will surely promote a good social atmosphere of defending and learning from heroes and martyrs". Commentators in official media welcomed the Qiu Ziming prosecution as confirming that "the internet is not a place beyond the law", while legal scholars noted that the shift from the picking-quarrels offence to Article 299-1 had in fact lowered the applicable maximum penalty.

=== Memory-law scholarship ===
In the comparative literature, the law is increasingly analysed as a memory law. The historian Vincent K. L. Chang argues that scholarship on memory laws has been preoccupied with Europe and with a narrow category of laws criminalising statements about the past, such as Holocaust-denial bans, and that a functional, transnational typology is needed to capture laws—like China's—that also mandate commemoration and monopolise historical interpretation. He situates the 2018 law within a broader "juridification" of memory under Xi Jinping, alongside Party resolutions on history and implementing regulations, and draws attention to its extraterritorial reach through the 2020 measures on overseas memorials, which oblige diplomatic missions to maintain martyrs' memorials and to guide Chinese nationals abroad in commemoration. Xu, Gong and Yin, analysing the governance of "cyber historical nihilism", argue that the Party has "securitised" dissenting historical narratives as a threat to ideological and political security, and that the governance regime—of which the heroes-and-martyrs provisions are a part—serves to maintain the Party's authority over history writing and its legitimacy as the ruling party.

=== Criticism ===
Critics have argued that the law's vague standards chill legitimate historical inquiry and public debate. Lawyers and scholars interviewed by foreign media at the time of the Qiu Ziming and Luo Changping cases described the prosecutions as a curtailment of freedom of speech and as deterrent examples. Chang has argued that, where the overseas measures lead to interference with Chinese nationals living abroad, they may engage the host state's obligations to protect freedom of thought and expression under Articles 18 and 19 of the International Covenant on Civil and Political Rights, but cautions that European states should not respond by legislating rival official histories of their own. The Gao Zhen case prompted renewed criticism concerning the application of Article 299-1 to artistic works that predated the offence.

== See also ==
- Censorship in China
- Historical nihilism
- Martyr (China)
- Martyrs' Day (China)
- Memory law
- Patriotic Education Law of the People's Republic of China
