= Monument to the People's Heroes =

Monument in Beijing, China

- 人民英雄纪念碑
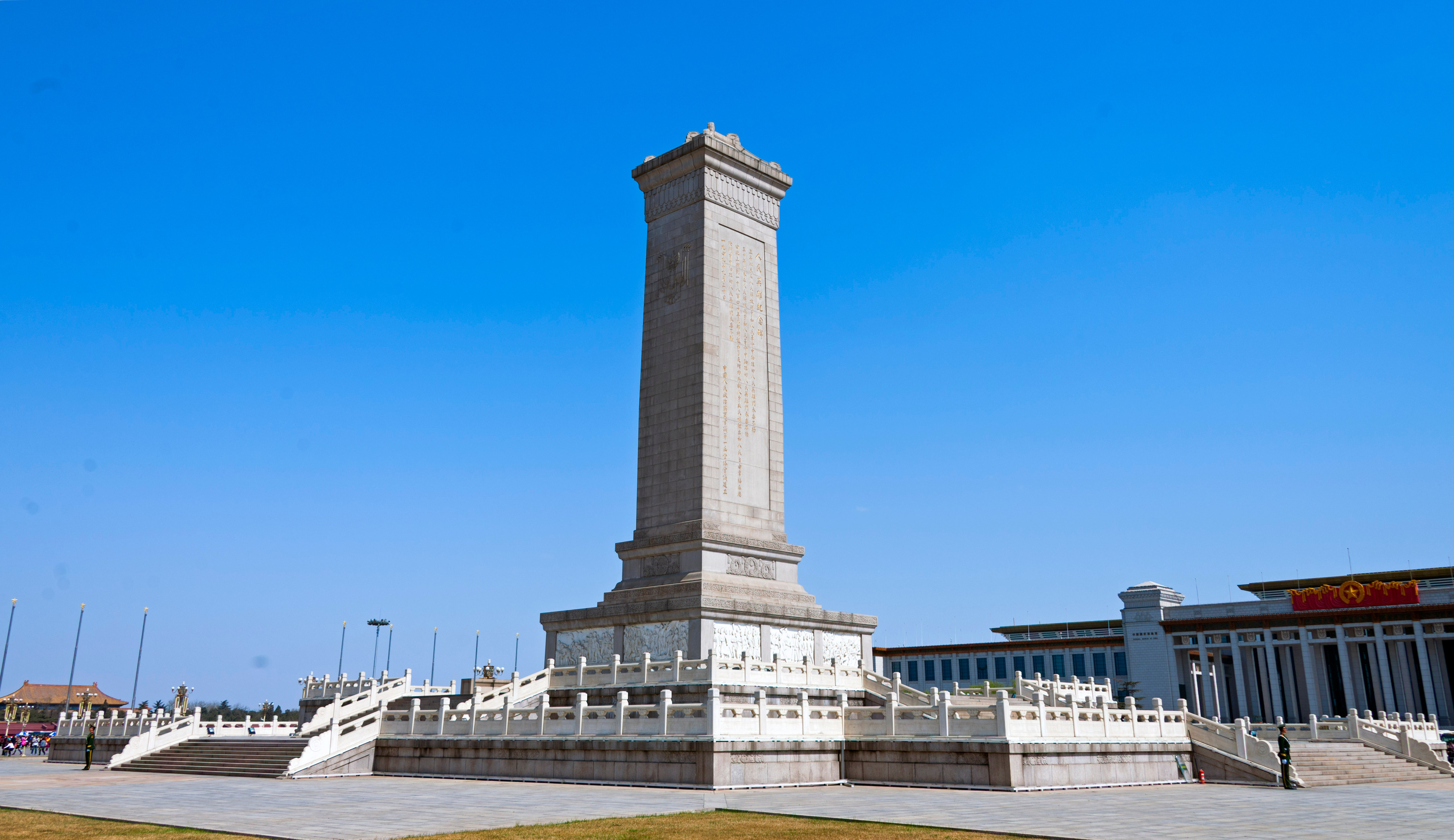
- Monument from southwest, 2014
- Interactive map of Monument to the People's Heroes
- Location: Tiananmen Square, Beijing, China
- Coordinates: 39°54′11″N 116°23′30″E
- Designer: Liang Sicheng, Lin Huiyin
- Type: Cenotaph
- Material: Marble, granite
- Height: 38 metres (125 ft)
- Beginning date: August 1952
- Completion date: May 1958
- Dedicated to: Veterans of Chinese wars 1842–1949

The Monument to the People's Heroes (Chinese: 人民英雄纪念碑; pinyin: Rénmín Yīngxióng Jìniànbēi) is a ten-story obelisk that was erected as a national monument of China to the martyrs of revolutionary struggle during the 19th and 20th centuries. It is located in the southern part of Tiananmen Square in Beijing, in front of the Mausoleum of Mao Zedong. The obelisk monument was built in accordance with a resolution of the first plenary session of the Chinese People's Political Consultative Conference (CPPCC) adopted on November 30, 1949, with construction lasting from August 1952 to May 1958. The architect of the monument was Liang Sicheng, with some elements designed by his wife, Lin Huiyin. The civil engineer, Chen Zhide (陈志德) was also instrumental in realizing the final product.

The monument is 37.94 meters high, sitting south to north, from bottom to top for the pedestal, giant pedestal, the pedestal body, the top of the monument, the pedestal inlaid with eight large reliefs and two small reliefs, all to the theme of the major events of modern Chinese history. The center stone of the stele is taken from Laoshan Mountain, Qingdao, with "Eternal glory to the people's heroes" handwritten by Chairman of the Chinese Communist Party Mao Zedong on the front, and the inscription written by Mao and Premier Zhou Enlai on the back. Since its construction, the monument has been repaired many times, and in 1961, the Monument to the People's Heroes was listed as a Major cultural heritage sites under national-level protection.

== History ==
=== Preparation ===
After the liberation of Beiping, in September 1949, the first plenary session of the Chinese People's Political Consultative Conference decided to build a monument to the martyrs. Initially, the proposed sites included Babaoshan and Dongdan Square, but Tiananmen Square was finally chosen. The delegates who made the decision felt that the revolutionary tradition of the May Fourth Movement was present in front of Tiananmen Square, and that it would be convenient for people to come and pay their respects. The conference also adopted the inscription on the monument, written by Mao Zedong.

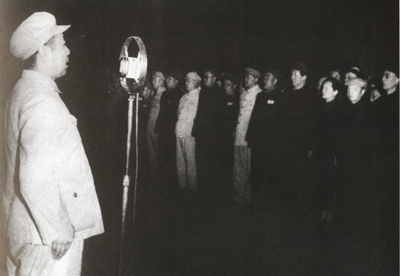
Representatives attending the First Plenary Session of the People's Political Consultative Conference held the Foundation Stone Laying Ceremony of the Monument to the People's Heroes in Tiananmen Square in 1949

On September 24, 1949, a staff member of the CPPCC found the engraver Chen Zhijing in Liulichang, and ordered from him a copper lapis lazuli monument for laying the foundation stone, the pedestal was 2 feet high, the monument body was 5 feet high, 2 feet wide, and half a foot thick. on September 25, the monument's inscription was handed over by the staff member to Chen Zhijing and his brother. The monument was completed on September 29. In the second day, the foundation stone laying ceremony for the monument was held in Tiananmen Square, with all the representatives of the first CPPCC present. The foundation stone was laid by the People's Liberation Army Military Orchestra, which played the March of the Volunteers and Wind Chimes, after which Mao Zedong read the monument's inscription. Then, all the delegates and members of the CPPCC filled in the earth.

Shortly afterward, the Beijing Municipal Urban Planning Commission solicited designs from all over the country. By 1951, during the one-year call period, the committee received a total of more than 140 design proposals. These designs can be generally categorized into three types - flat on the ground, giant sculptures, or towering monuments. The design forms of monuments include obelisks, monumental columns, and ancient Chinese monuments. These designs were finalized by the committee and were not adopted. The committee decided that the monument should be tall, and that only one of the two sides of the monument should have text, while the other side was temporarily vacant, so they asked Chairman Mao Zedong to inscribe the words "People's Heroes Forever", and Peng Zhen to ask Premier Zhou Enlai to write the inscription that had previously been written by Mao Zedong on the other side of the monument. After that, the Urban Planning Committee got inspiration from the "Wanshoushan Kunming Lake" monument in the Summer Palace and the "Qiongdao Chunyin" monument in the Beihai, and formed a feasible design that could be eventually constructed, but the theme for the top of the monument could not be determined at that time.

=== Construction ===
In May 1952, the Committee for the Construction of the Monument to the People's Heroes was formally established. It was headed by Peng Zhen, with Zheng Zhenduo and Liang Sicheng as deputy directors, and Xue Zizheng as secretary-general. The entire People's Heroes Monument Construction Committee has four specialized committees, namely:

- Construction Committee: members are Zheng Xiaoxie, Liu Guannan, Zhong Sen, Zhang Xiangfai, Wu Liusheng.
- Architectural Design Committee: members are Zhuang Jun, Yang Tingbao, Zheng Zhenduo, Zhang Bo, Zhu Zhaoxue, Zhao Zhengzhi, Lin Huiyin, Mo Zongjiang, Wu Liangyong, Wang Zhaowen, Chen Zhanxiang. Besides, Xue Zizheng, Wu Huaqing, Liang Sijing were present. Liang Sicheng was the convenor.
- Structural Design Specialized Committee: members are Yang Kuanlin, Chen Zhizhong, Chen Liangsheng, Mao Yisheng, Cai Fangyin, Lin Shibe, Chen Zhide, Bian Weide, Wang Mingzhi. The convenor is Zhu Zhaoxue.
- Sculpture and Painting Committee: members are Fan Wenlan, Liu Dainian, Rong Mengyuan, Zheng Zhenduo, Wang Yeqiu, Jiang Feng, Wang Zhenwen, Chen Yi, Mu Chuhuang, Pei Tong. The convener is Fan Wenlan.

In mid-July 1952, the Historical Material Committee put forward the theme of the bas-relief program. The scheme consisted of nine panels, initially including Jinggang Mountains, Boxer Rebellion, Pingxingguan, Sanyuanli, Guerrilla Warfare, and the Long March, but the relevant themes were not finalized at this time.

On August 1, 1952, the construction of the Monument to the People's Heroes officially started. Monument stone mining from the Laoshan Mountain, the handling of seamless steel pipe billet bottom, with a steel wire rope and three tractors connected to the mountains from the Qingdao Railway Station, transported smoothly. Railroad department prepared from the small Fengman hydroelectric power station to transfer the train wagon can carry 90 tons. On October 13, 1953, the stone was transported to Xizhimen Railway Station. The Committee then changed the design of the monument from south to north to north-south in order to rationalize the layout of the site for subsequent events. On March 6 and 7, 1955, the installation of the two monuments was completed, using two cranes with a total capacity of 30 tons in combination with a pulley block and a high boom. After the army surveying and mapping department enlarged the handwritten characters of Mao Zedong and Zhou Enlai by taking photos, Liu Kaiqiu dealt with the burrs caused by the enlargement, and then gave them to the stonemasons to be traced and engraved on the center stone of the monument. The stonemason used high-pressure water gun to spray the mineral sand way to carve the inscription, after the completion of the carving and then gilt the inscription, and finally successfully completed the processing of the monument center stone.

The construction of the monument was slowed down between 1952 and 1954 due to the failure to finalize the key designs for the top of the monument and the reliefs on the monument's body. On November 6, 1954, the Beijing Municipal People's Government Committee met and agreed on the design of the reliefs and the top of the monument, confirming that the top of the monument would be an architectural top and abandoning the idea of a sculptural top. The bas-reliefs, on the other hand, formed the final version of 8 large and 2 small. The work related to the relief was completed by Liu Kaiqu. By the end of October and early November 1956, the bas-reliefs were all made, and by August 1, 1957, they were installed.

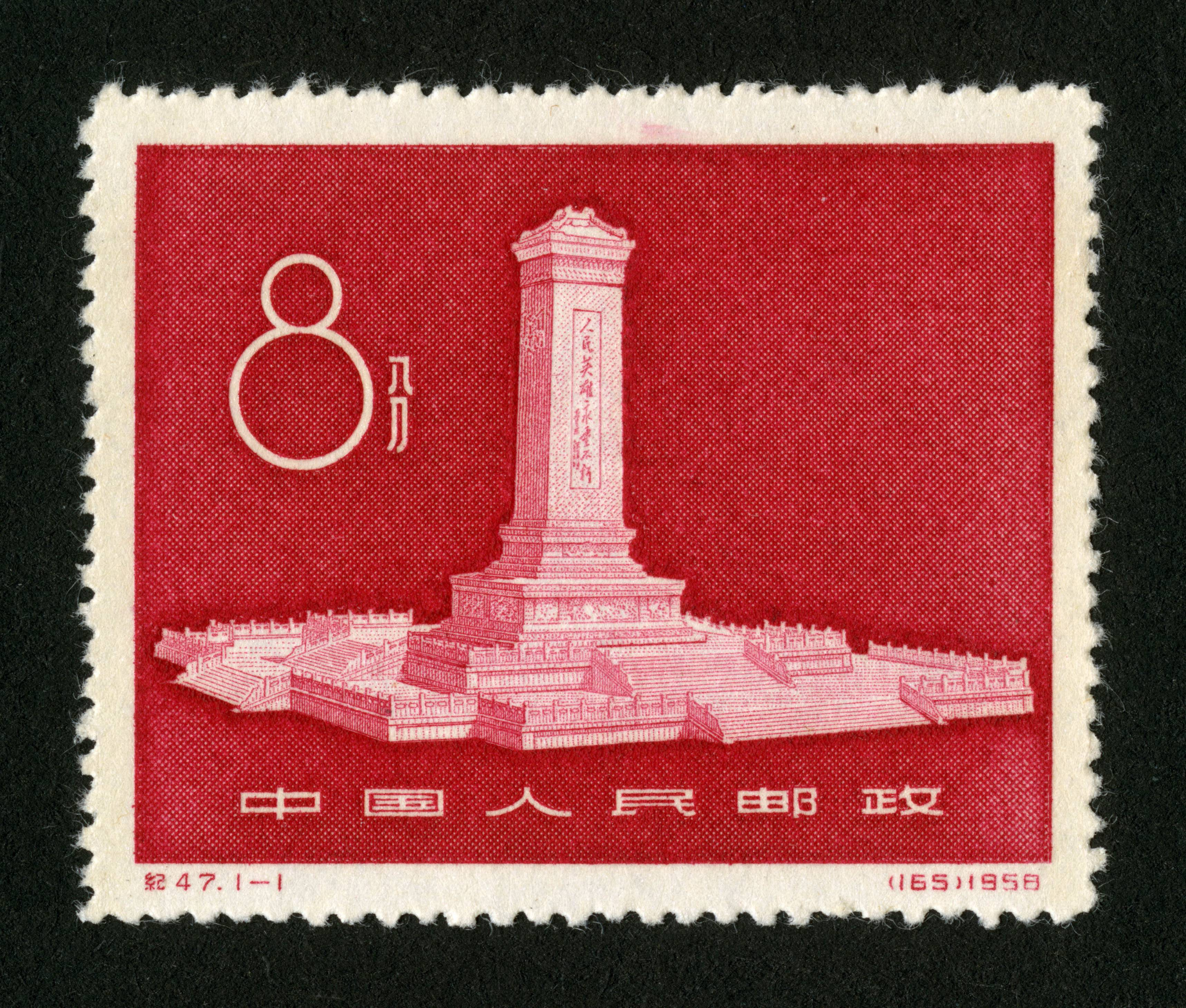
Commemorative Stamps for the Monument to the People's Heroes, No. 47, Issued in May 1958

The Monument to the People's Heroes was officially completed in April 1958 and unveiled on May 1 of the same year. The monument cost a total of RMB 405,000 yuan to build.

== Structure ==
The Monument to the People's Heroes is located in Tiananmen Square, Dongcheng District, Beijing, the center is 440 meters away from the base of the Tiananmen Square wall, sitting in the south and facing the north, covering an area of 3,000 square meters, with a height of 37.94 meters. The whole monument is made of 13,000 pieces of granite and alabaster.

On the pedestal of the tablet are huge bas-reliefs depicting eight major revolutionary episodes, which can be read in chronological order in a clockwise direction from the east:

1. Destruction of opium at Humen (1839), in the run-up to the First Opium War
2. Jintian Uprising, the catalyst for the Taiping Revolution (1851)
3. Wuchang Uprising, the catalyst for the Xinhai Revolution (1911)
4. May 4th Movement (1919)
5. May 30 Movement (1925)
6. Nanchang Uprising (1927)
7. War of Resistance Against Japan (1931-1945)
8. Yangtze River Crossing Campaign of the Chinese Civil War (1949)

On the front of the monument is an inscription in Mao Zedong's handwriting, which reads, "Eternal glory to the people's heroes!" (Chinese: 人民英雄永垂不朽; pinyin: Rénmín yīngxióng yǒngchuí bùxiǔ).

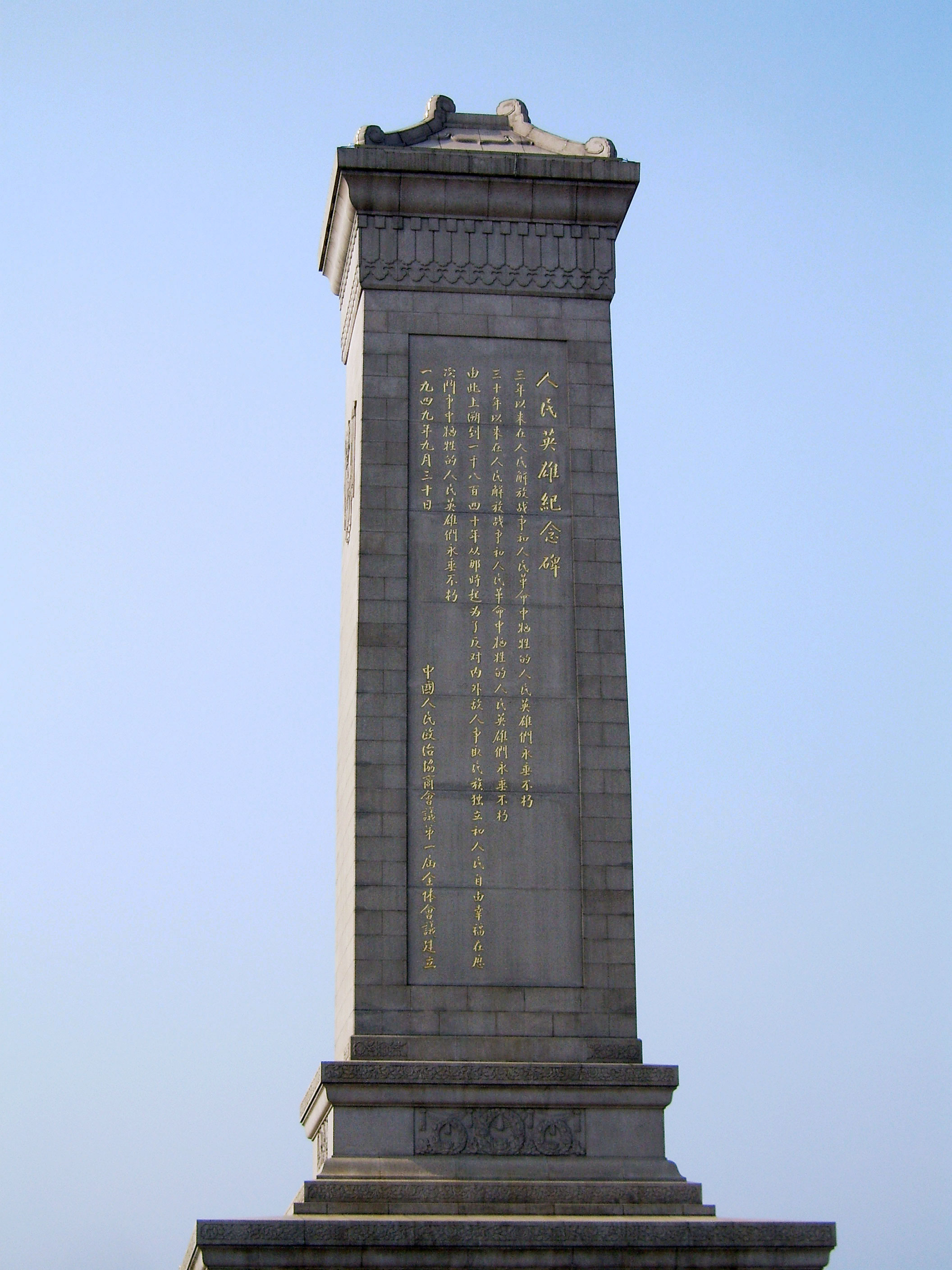
Epitaph in gold

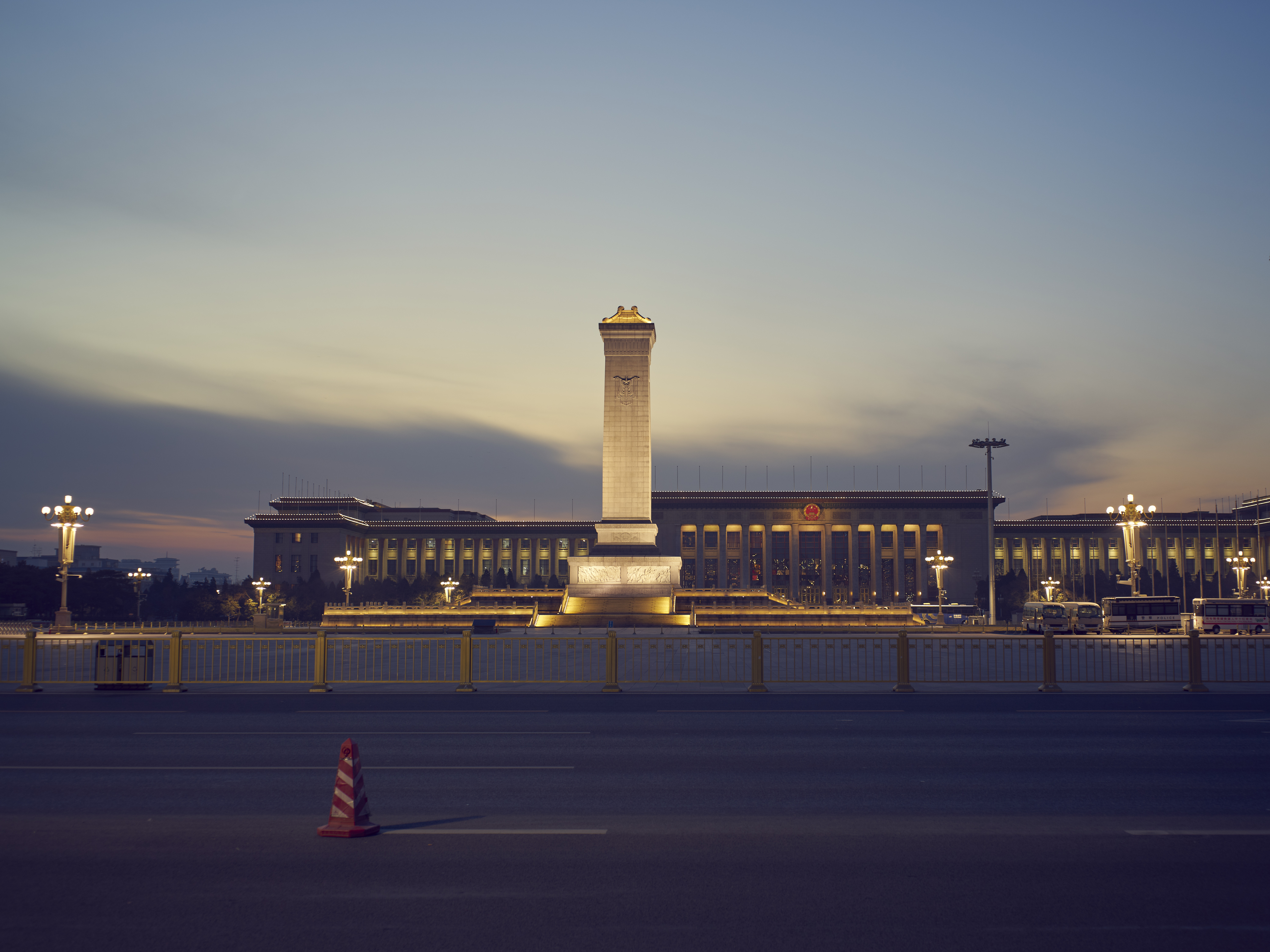
The Monument, in front of the Great Hall of the People, 2016

On the back of the monument is an epitaph written by Mao:

Immortal Glory to the People's Heroes who laid down their lives in the People's War of Liberation and the People's Revolution in the past three years!
Immortal Glory to the People's Heroes who laid down their lives in the People's War of Liberation and the People's Revolution in the past thirty years!
Immortal Glory to the People's Heroes who, since the year 1840s, have given their lives in the many struggles to resist the enemy, domestic and foreign, to strive for the independence of the nation and the freedom of the people!

The time framing of since the 1840s was intended to encompass the China's modern history beginning with the Opium Wars, thereby framing the period of the 1840s to the 1940s as an anti-imperialist and revolutionary century.

== Commemoration ==
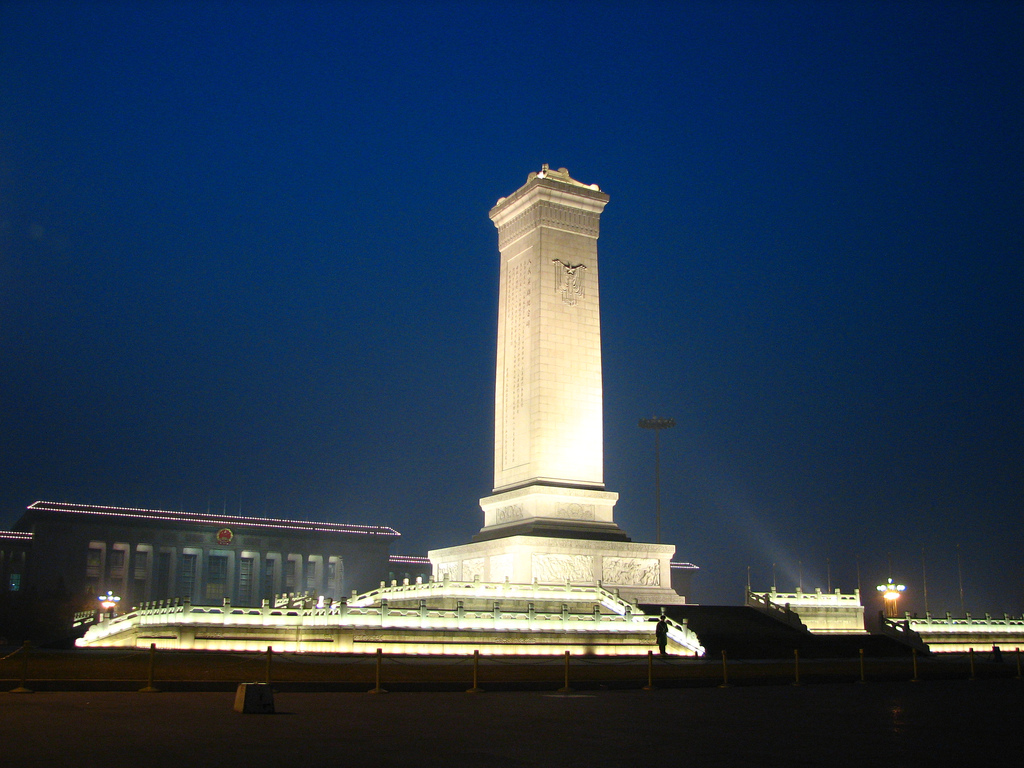
The Monument to the People's Heroes with the Great Hall of the People in the background, illuminated at night

The conduct of commemoration activities at the Monument to the People's Heroes is regulated by the Major Events Administration Office of the Tiananmen Area Administrative Committee.

After the National Day in 1959, Premier Zhou Enlai had planned to change the top of the monument to a material that could light up, for which the State Council collected dozens of new designs for the top of the monument for the design departments and colleges and universities across the country. However, due to the lack of better solutions, the revision plan was not pursued. In 1961, the Monument to the People's Heroes was listed as a national key cultural relics protection unit. Since 1980, it has been customary for visiting foreign dignitaries, to lay wreaths at the monument when visiting Beijing.

Starting from February 8, 2006, to July 14, 2006, construction crews began to repair the pedestal and railing of the Monument to the People's Heroes, as well as to clean the bas-reliefs and the monument's body, and to repair the cracks. In 2014, in order to meet the 65th anniversary of the founding of the new China, the Monument to the People's Heroes was restored with a comprehensive cleaning and maintenance. In the same year, China established the Martyrs' Memorial Day, and on the day of the Memorial Day, Chinese national leaders were required to present flower baskets to the Monument to the People's Heroes.

Enacted in 2018, Article 7 of the Law on the Protection of Heroes and Martyrs designates the Monument to the People's Heroes as a permanent memorial facility to commemorate and honor the heroes and martyrs, as well as a symbol of the spirit of the Chinese people and the Chinese nation's struggle for national independence and emancipation, the people's freedom and happiness, and the country's prosperity and strength in the modern era. The law further asserts that the monument and its name, inscription, inscriptions, bas-reliefs, graphics, symbols, etc., are subject to the law's protection.

== See also ==
- History of Beijing
- Monument to the People's Heroes (Shanghai)
- China Millennium Monument
- Martyrs' Day (China)
