= Spiritually Japanese =

Chinese sociopolitical pejorative

"Spiritually Japanese" (Chinese: 精神日本人; pinyin: Jīngshén Rìběnrén; Japanese pronunciation: Sēshin Nihonjin), abbreviated as jingri (Chinese: 精日; pinyin: jīngrì), is a pejorative term used in sociopolitical discourse in China to refer to Chinese people who are perceived to hold extreme pro-Japanese and anti-Chinese sentiments. According to Chinese state media, archetypal traits of those perceived as being "spiritually Japanese" include issuing expressions of support for Japanese militarism, defending or minimising Japanese war crimes in China and more broadly speaking holding a favourable view of Japan. Chinese people who express admiration for modern Japanese politicians or challenge China's unilateral sovereignty claims may also be considered "spiritually Japanese". A neologism that developed out of online communities, the term has seen increasing use in recent years.

== Background ==
The increased prevalence of international cultural exchange in the modern world has increased the influence of foreign cultures, including Japanese culture, on certain segments of Chinese society. According to Chinese Communist theorists Yang Jinhua and Huang Chenchen, this has led to the rise of jingri who accord with the values and politics of Japanese society far more than they do China's, seemingly viewing China as merely an "accidental place of birth" while according Japan with the title of their "spiritual motherland". They seek to maintain a "Japanese-style" manner of living. Some internet celebrities seen as jingri have made statements or engaged in actions that express support for or present a romanticized image of Japan. These have included many forms of expression, including expression in the form of text, images, language choice, music, video media, and body language, up to dressing up as World War Two-era Japanese military officers. Among them have been those who hold unusual interpretations of the Nanjing massacre, with some even stating that "the [Japanese military] killed too few people [in Nanjing]." This has incited anti-Japanese xenophobia in China. Some individuals who have praised Japan, labelled as supporters of the Japanese far right, have been violently attacked in public.

According to a Chinese-language BBC article, jingri generally refers not to those who merely appreciate Japan's technological advancements, support friendly China-Japan relations, or consume Japanese goods, but rather to those who "spiritually equate themselves with Japanese people (that are on the far right)."

== Incidents ==
=== 2014 ===
On September 6, 2014, during the 28th Taishan International Mountaineering Festival, a man was seen wearing clothing bearing the words "Imperial Japanese Navy". He was subsequently surrounded and reproached by onlookers, upon which he explained that he had grown up in Japan and that the clothing was part of his normal dress. A member of the crowd came forward to rip his clothing off, leading to a confrontation between the man and other tourists. In the end, the man put on a jacket provided by staff members at the festival before being escorted away by police.

=== 2017 ===
The Sihang warehouse Japanese military costume photograph incident occurred on the afternoon of August 7, 2017. In response to the incident, Sina Weibo user "上帝之鷹_5zn" (lit. 'God's eagle') made a post stating "While wearing WWII-era Japanese military uniforms, 4 jingri came by night to the Sihang Warehouse, a well-known historical site from the Sino-Japanese war and a patriotic education centre, and viciously disgraced the heroic souls of the martyrs; this is a sight that makes your blood boil; please spread this widely!" A screenshot indicated that the QQ user "利冯茲·维森" (lit. 'Ribbons Wissen') had made a post stating that "Thanks to everybody's help, our trip of seven days around Songhu has been completed successfully, including the night ambush with four people." In the post, the user mentions several details relating to the execution of their plan, indicating that many people were present on that night who did it in a matter of seconds." They also called the experience "thrilling". They indicated that "if I had to make up a plot for this, it would be that in the final part of the war, military officers who had participated in the Battle of Shanghai returned to pay the place another visit." While taking the photographs, onlookers stared at the participants but did not try to stop them.

On August 13, 2017, individuals wearing Japanese military uniforms appeared in Binyang County and openly supported the Japanese invasion of China during the Second Sino-Japanese War.

=== 2018 ===
On February 20, 2018, two men appeared at the Xishan pillbox cluster on Purple Mountain in Nanjing wearing Japanese military uniforms. That night, the two received strong criticism on social media. Following the incident, a man made threats towards the individual who reported on the incident and was placed under administrative detention for 7 days by police. In August of the same year, the Sina Weibo user 司波达也太君 (Shiba Tatsuya-taijin) posted various comments, including "Prime Minister Abe is my real father" and "I am not a servant of the West; I'm a jingri", in the commentary section of the Mianyang internet police's Weibo account page. On August 16, he was placed under administrative detention without trial by the police department of Ma'anshan in Anhui Province, which found that his online commentary had broken China's laws on picking quarrels and provoking trouble.

=== 2019 ===
On April 8, 2019, phrases such as "long live Japan", "those who support China are stupid cunts" and "down with Chinese imperialism" suddenly appeared on an LED screen above the door to the emergency department of Gaoyang County's hospital. A netizen who discovered that the signage had been digitally vandalized took a short video clip of it, with hospital security attempting to stop him. After the video was uploaded, it immediately incited public attention. Following this, the hospital cut power to the screen and coordinated with Gaoyang County's health department to report the incident to the police. At around 3 p.m., police arrested a 31-year-old suspect surnamed Li in connection with the incident.

On July 11, 2019, it was revealed that Wuhan University had accepted a Taiwanese exchange student named Ke Quanyao who had posted jingri commentary on Facebook, including expressing anticipation for the "motherland" Japan to retake Taiwan and claiming that Taiwan and Japan are "two islands that both belong to the same Japan". Following this, Ke abandoned his plans to attend Wuhan University.

On July 28 and 29, 2019, the provinces of Liaoning, Anhui, Hubei and Jiangsu jointly published a communiqué on police actions taken to combat allegedly jingri elements in society. According to the communiqué, police in Shahekou, Liaoning Province have accused a Liaoning resident surnamed Lu of posting jingri commentary and cartoons that were anti-China or that humiliated the Chinese people on foreign websites, and of disseminating anti-China, pro-jingri ideas towards Chinese youth in order to draw them into an illegal organization that he established online. Lu was arrested by police while returning from Japan. Police in Huainan, Anhui Province claimed that a 22-year-old local female resident, Zhang Dongning, had made a series of cartoons consisting of more than 300 panels that mocked the Chinese people, depicting them with pig heads. According to police, Zhang Dongning had an interest in Japanese manga and very much adored Japanese culture, displaying clear jingri and anti-China tendencies. Zhang had made contact online with Lu and began making the cartoons for Lu to publish online. Zhang Dongning was arrested in May 2019. Police in Susong County, Anhui indicated that individuals holding Laizhou, Jiangxi residency surnamed Ye, Xu, Liu, and Liao had sold illegally-obtained personal information to jingris. The four were arrested in October 2018 and sentenced in March 2019. Police in Wuhan and Yichang, Hubei indicated that an arrest has been approved for a 24-year-old man surnamed Zhang because he had posted reactionary rumours and personal information; used the internet to violently intimidate others; and stirred up ethnic hatred and besmirched the national image. A 17-year-old surnamed Li only received a reprimand due to admitting his mistakes with a good attitude and offering up information about crimes committed by other jingri individuals. Police in Fancheng District, Hubei indicated that a netizen surnamed Zhang had colluded with anti-China jingri elements over social media; he was reported and received 7 days of administrative detention without trial. Police in Jianli, Hubei indicated that a jingri surnamed Zhu had been formulating and spreading discourse online that "shames China" or "opposes China". Jianli Police state that after being reported and while under police investigation, Zhu, at his own volition, offered up information about other jingri individuals, deleted the harmful information that he had posted, and logged out of the relevant social networking accounts; he received a reprimand from police. Police in Nanjing, Jiangsu indicated that a 20-year-old Changshu resident surnamed Dai had stolen several hundred Weibo accounts and impersonated Mianyang Internet Police, was spreading commentary that was anti-China or disgraceful towards China, and had disseminated Japanese militarist ideas towards youth. Dai received administrative detention without trial.

On September 29, 2019, a Langzhong, Sichuan man surnamed Qi whose WeChat username was "24K Chunshuai" (24K纯帅, 24K pure handsome) posted in a WeChat conversation about the movie My People, My Country (Chinese: 我和我的祖国; lit. 'My motherland and I') the words "My Great Japanese Empire and I". He also, on numerous occasions, expressed controversial commentary about the military parades held for the 70th anniversary of the foundation of the People's Republic of China and was criticized and reported by other WeChat users. At dawn on September 30, Langzhong Police placed Qi under administrative detention lasting 7 days in accordance with section 26 of the Public Security Administration Punishments Law of the People's Republic of China.

== Reactions ==
=== Official ===
The Chinese government and the Chinese Communist Party, as well as media outlets affiliated with them, have made statements defining the jingri phenomenon, delineating jingri from what they perceive to be a healthy appreciation for foreign cultures, and condemning those they see as jingri. The government and Party have also implemented and proposed legal measures in the name of combatting the jingri phenomenon.

The Communist Youth League of China has stated that "appreciation of the excellency of foreign cultures is not at odds with passionate love for one's own country" and that merely enjoying Japanese manga and animation, eating Japanese cuisine and loving Japanese culture does not make a person jingri. Instead, Jingri are those who display a clear passion for Japanese militarism, elevating it above their love for their own culture, and thereby disrespect or humiliate their own country. According to a commentator for the Frontline magazine, the magazine of the Communist Party Committee of Beijing, jingri differ in their actions and motives, expressing their tendencies in different ways. The crux of the jingri phenomenon, according to the commentator, is a distorted view of history rooted in historical nihilism. The commentator further indicates that jingri elements in society blindly worship Japan, defend the criminal acts Japan has committed in invading other countries, express commentary that damages "national feelings", and fabricate history in favour of their ideological goals.

According to the Communist Party newspaper Global Times, jingri are "hiding among us", with jingri groups being found on QQ and Baidu Tieba.

Chinese Foreign Minister Wang Yi indicated on March 8, 2018, that jingri are "failures of Chinese people". At the same time, 38 artists who were members of the Chinese People's Political Consultative Conference, including Zhang Kaili and Jackie Chan, jointly submitted a proposal relating to "the drafting of the Law on the Protection of National Prestige and National Dignity" that would make jingri activities punishable under criminal law.

At the second meeting of the Standing Committee of the 13th National People's Congress on April 27, 2018, the Law on the Protection of Heroes and Martyrs was passed unanimously. The law implements legal protections for those designated as heroes or martyrs, and has provisions relating to combatting "jingri elements". It prohibits distortion, vilification, and denial of the legacy and spirit of those designated heroes and martyrs, as well as disrespect and slander thereof. On August 28, at the fifth meeting of the 16th National People's Congress's Standing Committee, the Provisions on Protecting State-led Public Veneration in the City of Nanjing (Draft) were submitted for review. The Provisions forbid any organization or individual from distorting or denying the historical truths of the Nanjing Massacre; from disgracing or slandering the victims and survivors of the massacre and the soldiers who died in the Second Sino-Japanese War; and from formulating or disseminating speech or information that damages national and ethnic dignity or damages the feelings of the people. It is also forbidden to use World War II-era Japanese military uniforms, symbols, or related props to pose for photographs or videos on sites such as public places of commemoration or to use the internet to publicly disseminate such images to extol or whitewash the war and invasion. No organization or individual may violate the rights that Nanking Massacre victims and survivors have relating to their names, likeness, reputation, honour, or other legal rights. Under the Provisions, those in violation would incur legal responsibility.

=== Critical ===
Both those who have judged the Japanese invasion of China in World War Two approvingly and those who have merely expressed admiration for modern Japanese culture have been labelled jingri and have received online harassment, public condemnations, doxxing, and even physical assault. Among them, some important figures have had the Chinese Communist Party revoke their party membership and have been named in strongly-worded condemnations disseminated on state media. The Tian Guiliang incident involved Party members and other individuals.

At first, the concept of jingri was poorly delineated. Some in the Chinese public called for full-scale opposition towards Japan, in which those who went to Japan as tourists or who looked up to Japanese celebrities would be targeted by nationalists in attacks reminiscent of Cultural Revolution-style struggle sessions. The occurrence of such incidents attracted the attention of foreign media and the Chinese Communist Party. Hong Kong dissident newspaper Apple Daily indicated that the Anti-Japanese demonstrations of 2010 were harming China without affecting Japan.

Japanese media personality Shizuhito Musashino indicated that in turning the phrase spiritually Japanese into a smear, the Chinese government is intentionally matching up "Japanese" to the Imperial Japan of the Second World War, rather than post-war Japan. According to Musashino, this indicates an inability on the part of China to come to a fair understanding of a post-war Japan that has achieved freedom and democratization. To Musashino, the condemnation of jingri in China in fact betrays a lack of national self-esteem.

Musashino believes that a more accurate definition for jingri would be "people whose sentimental attachment or sense of belonging towards Japan exceeds that which they hold towards their motherland of China"; in other words, they are "Chinese people who love Japan very much." They have either visited Japan in real life or been exposed to authentic expressions of Japanese culture, including animation, video games, and soap operas, and therefore feel distaste towards the "anti-Japan education" promulgated in China. Musashino noted that in his interviews with Chinese people self-identifying as jingri, said people also expressed opposition to the act of wearing Japanese military costumes to Chinese World War II memorials. Musashino holds that it is not wrong to choose Japan as a spiritual motherland, as everyone has the right to choose their favourite country. At the same time, he indicated that liking Japan and liking China are not mutually exclusive, and that the propagandization and smearing of jingri in China has affected good faith admirers of Japan, causing them to be afraid to express their views. According to Musashino, China should instead face the outside world with bravery and self esteem and choose the path of civilization and progress.

== See also ==
- Weeaboo
- Chinilpa
- Hanjian
- China-Japan relations
- Japanese war crimes
- Race traitor
- Quisling – Scandinavian and English pejorative term
- Makapili, Filipino term
- Uncle Tom
- Việt gian, Vietnamese pejorative term
- Spiritually Finnish, neutral or positive term also used in China
- Spiritually Israeli
