= Martyrs' Day (China) =

Observance in China on 30 September

- Traditional Chinese: 烈士紀念日
- Simplified Chinese: 烈士纪念日
Transcriptions
Standard Mandarin
- Hanyu Pinyin: lièshì jìniànrì

Martyrs' Day (Chinese: 烈士纪念日) is celebrated in China on 30 September, the eve of the National Day of the People's Republic of China, to commemorate martyrs who lost their lives serving China. It was created by the Standing Committee of the National People's Congress in 2014.

== Legislation ==
On 31 August 2014, the Tenth Meeting of the Standing Committee of the 12th National People's Congress adopted the Decision of the Standing Committee of the National People's Congress on the Establishment of Martyrs' Remembrance Day, which stipulates that 30 September of each year, the day on which the foundation stone of the Monument to the People's Heroes was laid, is to be Martyrs' Remembrance Day, and also stipulates that the State will hold activities in commemoration of martyrs on 30 September of each year:

Decision of the Standing Committee of the National People's Congress on the Establishment of Martyrs' Memorial Day

(Adopted at the Tenth Session of the Standing Committee of the Twelfth National People's Congress on August 31, 2014)

In recent times, countless heroes have sacrificed their lives in order to fight for national independence and the freedom and happiness of the people, and for the prosperity and strength of the country; the feats of the martyrs have made their names known in history, and the spirit of the martyrs will live on forever. In order to carry forward the spirit of the martyrs, remember the achievements of the martyrs, cultivate the spirit of patriotism, collectivism and socialist morality of the citizens, cultivate and practice the core socialist values, enhance the cohesion of the Chinese nation, and stimulate the realization of the Chinese Dream of the great rejuvenation of the Chinese nation of a strong spiritual force, the twelfth session of the Standing Committee of the National People's Congress decided:

To establish September 30 as Martyrs' Day. On September 30 each year, the State will hold activities to commemorate martyrs.

Subsequently, the General Office of the Chinese Communist Party, the General Office of the State Council, and the General Office of the Central Military Commission issued the Notice on Commemorating Martyrs' Day. Among other things, it stipulates that all regions, departments and units should carefully organize and arrange various commemorative activities, includes holding public ceremonies for martyrs; offering flowers to martyrs' graves; carrying out online activities to commemorate martyrs; caring for the surviving family members of the martyrs, and "establishing and improving the working mechanism of unified leadership of the Party committee, administrative leadership of the government, active cooperation of the departments, and broad participation of the society."

On 27 April 2018, the Second meeting of the Standing Committee of the 13th National People's Congress (NPC) voted unanimously to adopt the Law on the Protection of Heroes and Martyrs. The Law stipulates that Martyrs' Memorial Day will be celebrated on 30 September every year.

== Commemorations ==
30 September 2014 was China's first Martyrs' Day. General Secretary of the Chinese Communist Party Xi Jinping and other party and state leaders, together with representatives from all walks of life in Beijing, laid floral offerings to the martyrs in front of the Monument to the People's Heroes. On each subsequent 30 September, Chinese state leaders attended the ceremony and laid a wreath at the Monument to the People's Heroes.

== Recollection ==
During the various historical periods of China's revolutionary war beginning in 1919, socialist construction, and reform and opening-up, martyrs have sacrificed their lives for the independence of the nation, the liberation of the people, the wealth and strength of the country, and the happiness of the people. According to incomplete statistics, there have been about 20 million national martyrs since 1927, the beginning of the Chinese Civil War, and stretching back to 1925, the beginning of the Northern Expedition. Due to the limitations of wartime conditions, many martyrs have not left their names. By 2014, there were more than 1.93 million martyrs in China whose names could be traced and included in the Directory of Martyrs at all levels.

== See also ==
- Nanjing Massacre Memorial Day
- Remembrance Day
- Memorial Day
