= Japanophilia =

Affinity for Japanese culture

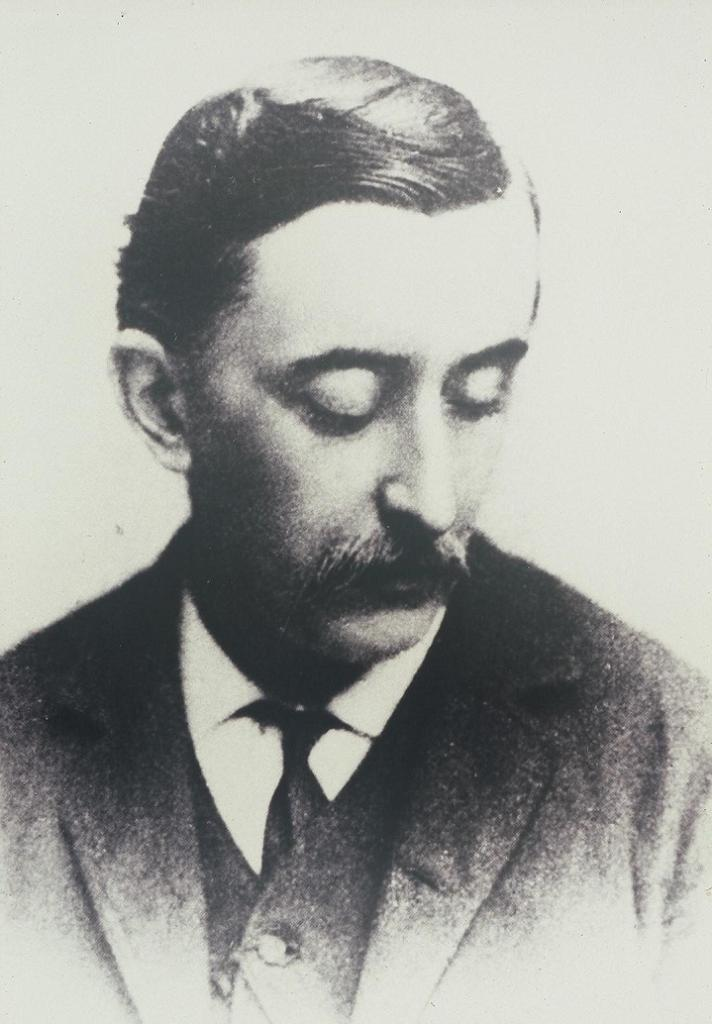
Lafcadio Hearn, who adopted the Japanese name Koizumi Yakumo, was an early Western enthusiast of Japanese culture.

Japanophilia is an outside interest in Japanese culture, people, and history. The Japanese term for this is shinnichi (親日; also meaning "pro-Japanese").

== History ==
=== 18th–19th century ===
The term "Japanophile" originated in the late 18th and early 19th centuries during Japan's period of sakoku, when contact with foreign countries was strictly limited. Carl Peter Thunberg and Philipp Franz von Siebold helped introduce Japanese flora, artworks, and other objects to Europe, which sparked interest. Lafcadio Hearn, an Irish-Greek author who made his home in Japan in the 19th century, was described as "a confirmed Japanophile" by Charles E. Tuttle Company in their forewords to several of his books. Others may include Jules Brunet, a French Army officer who played a famous role in the Japanese Boshin War.

=== 20th century ===
In the first decade of the 20th century, several British writers lauded Japan. In 1904, for example, Beatrice Webb wrote that Japan was a "rising star of human self-control and enlightenment", praising the "innovating collectivism" of the Japanese, and the "uncanny" purposefulness and open-mindedness of its "enlightened professional elite." H. G. Wells similarly named the élite of his A Modern Utopia "samurai". In part, this was a result of the decline of British industrial productivity, with Japan and Germany rising comparatively. Germany was seen as a threat and a rival power, but Japan was seen as a potential ally. The British sought efficiency as the solution to issues of productivity, and after the publication of Alfred Stead's 1906 book Great Japan: A Study of National Efficiency, pundits in Britain looked to Japan for lessons. This interest, however, ended after World War I.

General José Millán-Astray, the founder of the Spanish Legion, stated that the samurai warrior code Bushido exerted a great influence on him. Defining Bushido as "a perfect creed", Millán-Astray said that "the Spanish legionnaire is also a samurai and practices the Bushido essentials: Honor, Valor, Loyalty, Generosity, and Sacrifice", and added that Spain would become a great power like Japan by adhering to the code's principles. He also made a Spanish translation of Inazo Nitobe's book Bushido: The Soul of Japan and a prologue to it.

=== 21st century ===
==== Wapanese, weeaboo and weeb ====
The slang term wapanese (a portmanteau of white, or wannabe, and Japanese) appeared in the early 2000s as a derogatory word for a non-Japanese person who is unhealthily obsessed with modern Japanese popular culture, particularly anime, manga, visual novels, light novels, and Pokémon. It was added to the Urban Dictionary website in 2003, and frequently used on the imageboard site 4chan.

The term weeaboo (often shortened to weeb) first appeared in a 2005 The Perry Bible Fellowship webcomic, used without reference to Japanese culture. The same year, 4chan administrator Christopher Poole added a filter to the site replacing wapanese with weeaboo, and users themselves started using the new term in place of wapanese. While originally meant derogatorily, weeaboo has been reclaimed by some of its referents, and has been used by some hardcore fans of Japanese media to refer to themselves in an ironic or self-deprecating fashion.

In a blog post on Anime News Network, Justin Sevakis wrote that there is a difference between a weeaboo and someone who simply appreciates Japanese culture, saying that there is nothing wrong with loving Japanese culture, but that a person becomes a weeaboo when they start to be obnoxious, immature, and ignorant about the culture they love. Matt Jardin from the Alaska Dispatch described weeaboos as blindly preferring things from Japan and looking down on anything else, regardless of merit.

== See also ==
- Anime club
- Cool Japan
- Japan Expo
- Japanese studies
- Japanification – Process of becoming or wishing to become a member of Japanese society
- Japanization
- Japonisme
- Jingri
- List of Westerners who visited Japan before 1868
- Orientalism
- Pacific Movement of the Eastern World
- Sinophile
