= Japanification =

Process of becoming or wishing to become a member of Japanese society

Japanification (日本化) is the process of becoming or wishing to become a member of Japanese society. It most commonly refers to expats living for an extended period of time in Japan, though it may also be used to describe persons living outside Japan who have a certain affinity to some aspect of Japanese culture. Cultural assimilation could include adoption of Japanese mannerisms, style of clothing, taste in entertainment, and sometimes aspects of Japanese language.

In expats this process often occurs because of a feeling of isolation or desire to conform, whereas outside Japan it may occur because of an especially strong interest in some kind of fan culture based in Japan, e.g. anime, manga, television dramas, music or lolita fashion.

== In popular culture ==
Japanese culture has had a strong influence on American popular culture dating back to Japan's defeat in World War II and to the early 1950s when children of the United States were first introduced to Japanese popular culture, such as Godzilla.The Japanese culture also presented itself in popular video games such as Jet Set Radio, a game that has evident references to Japanese manga and graphic novels.

In Taiwan, the term harizu (哈日族) is used, which is taken from the pen-name of Taiwanese manga artist Chen Guixing, Hari Kyoko 哈日杏子. Not only does her pen-name include the word, but her first manga Good Morning Japan, released in 1996, also described an obsession with Japan as a "hari sickness". The ri in hari is short for Japan, and the ha comes from a Taiwanese Hokkien term meaning to love something to death (哈得要死).

Japanese culture has also had an influence on anime. This trend of Japan influencing children's popular culture continues with well-known icons such as Astro Boy, Hello Kitty, Doraemon, Dragon Ball Z, Sailor Moon, Pokémon, and One Piece. Japanese media is commonly described as Kawaii, a Japanese term meaning "cute" and "comfortable" in English.

== In economics ==
In addition to its cultural definition this process can be described as the transformation of an economy into one that follows the steps of Japan. In other words, it is a term used by economists that refers to falling into the same deflationary trap of collapsed demand that caused the Lost Decades. Japanification is an ongoing issue today as the US, UK, and other countries go through similar economic issues.

== Reasons ==
As more and more people became interested in Japanese society, the numbers of students and individuals learning the Japanese language increased. At its height of popularity there was a 10.3% increase in Japanese language enrollments in U.S. colleges and universities between 2006 and 2009, 66,605 in 2006 to 73,434 in 2009. The Japan Foundation reported a record high of 1.48 million applications for the Japanese Language Proficiency Test (JLPT) in 2023, with overseas applications exceeding 1 million for the first time, likely due to the easing of COVID restrictions.

This increase in Japanese language learners in the early years of the 21st century could be considered unusual given Japan's relative economic stagnation in the last few decades, but may in part be explained by the rising global popularity of Japanese pop culture during that same time period. Manga and anime were seen by some as a leading factor in reasons why the number of Japanese language learners was increasing, "Over 50% of Japanese language learners surveyed by the Japan Foundation in 2009 cited wanting to learn how to read manga and anime as a key reason for studying Japanese." As of 2014, many believe the global popularity of Japanese manga and anime is in decline. Some praise the 10% of high quality manga and anime for its initial popularity, and blame its recent decline in popularity on the 90% of low quality material that has been released in recent years. Another possible reason for the decline in sales could be the increase in "scanlations", which are described in a statement by Japan's Digital Comic Association: "The 36 publishers in Japan's Digital Comic Association and several American publishers are forming a coalition to combat the "rampant and growing problem" of scanlations — illicit digital copies of manga either translated by fans or scanned directly from legitimate English releases".

== See also ==
- Japanization
- Japonism
- Japanology
- Japanophile
- Otaku
- Kaizen
- Sinophile
- Korean Wave
- Taiwanese Wave
- Orientalism
