= Nanjing Massacre Memorial Day =

Annual observance in China

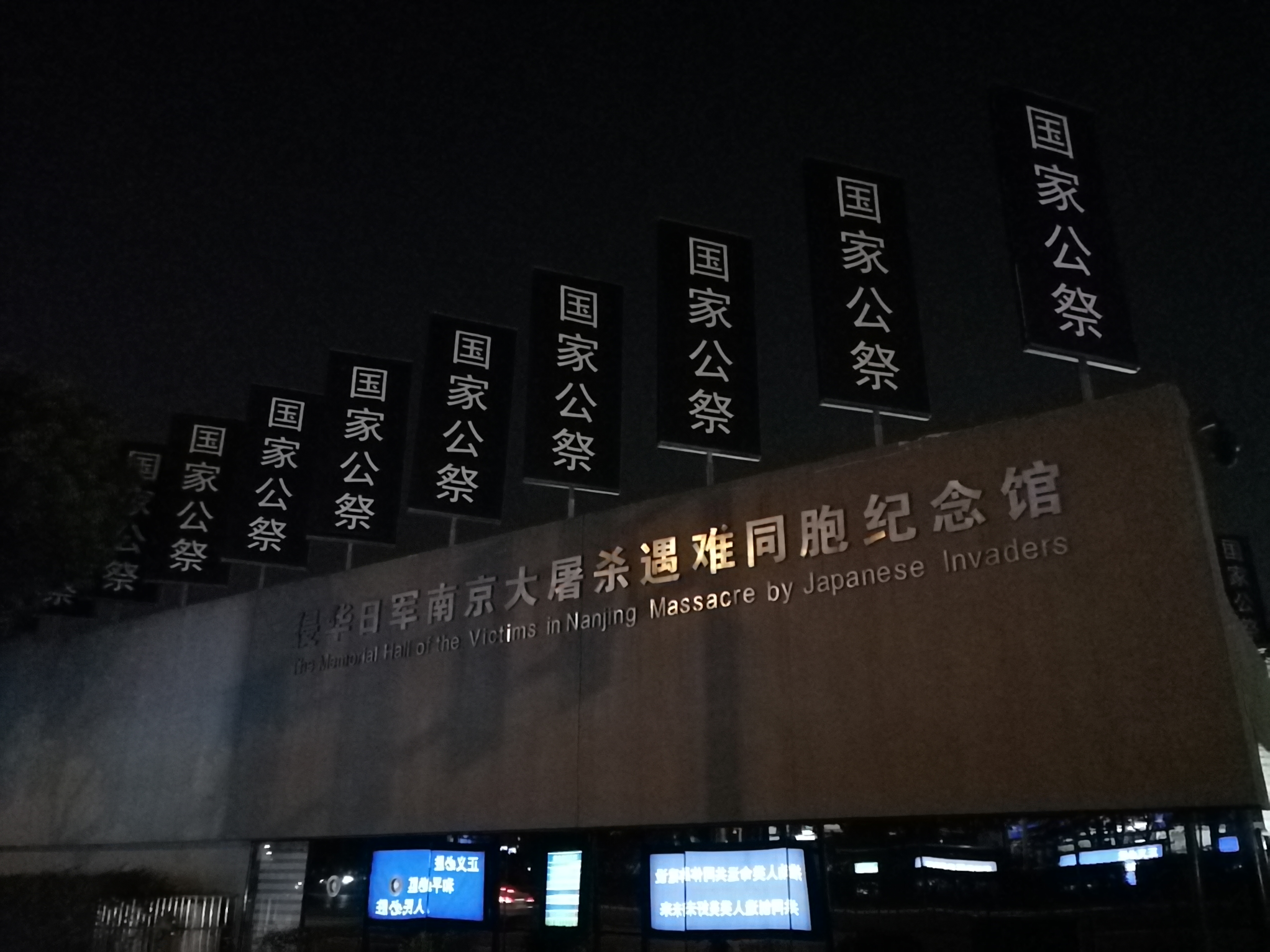
- The Nanjing Massacre Memorial Hall pictured in 2017 with signs for Nanjing Massacre Memorial Day
- Official name: National Memorial Day for the Victims of the Nanjing Massacre (南京大屠杀死难者国家公祭日)
- Observed by: China
- Date: 13 December
- Duration: One day
- Frequency: annual
- First time: 13 December 2014 (11 years ago)

The National Memorial Day for the Victims of the Nanjing Massacre (Note: Simplified Chinese: 南京大屠杀死难者国家公祭日; traditional Chinese: 南京大屠殺死難者國家公祭日; pinyin: Nánjīng Dàtúshā Sǐnànzhě Guójiā Gōngjì Rì. Also known in English as Nanjing Massacre Memorial Day or Nanjing Massacre National Memorial Day and in Chinese simply as National Memorial Day (simplified Chinese: 国家公祭日; traditional Chinese: 國家公祭日; pinyin: Guójiā Gōngjì Rì).) is a national memorial day observed in China on 13 December annually in honor of the Chinese victims of the Nanjing Massacre and the Second Sino-Japanese War. The observance draws attention to Japanese war crimes during this period. It was established in 2014 by the Standing Committee of the 12th National People's Congress.

Although the memorial day is named after the Nanjing Massacre, its honorees are not limited to victims of that massacre. Instead the day is to commemorate all who were killed during the era of the Second Sino-Japanese War, including victims of the Nanjing Massacre, victims of chemical weapons, victims of biological warfare, victims of forced labor, comfort women, victims of the Three Alls policy, and victims of indiscriminate bombing.

== Background ==
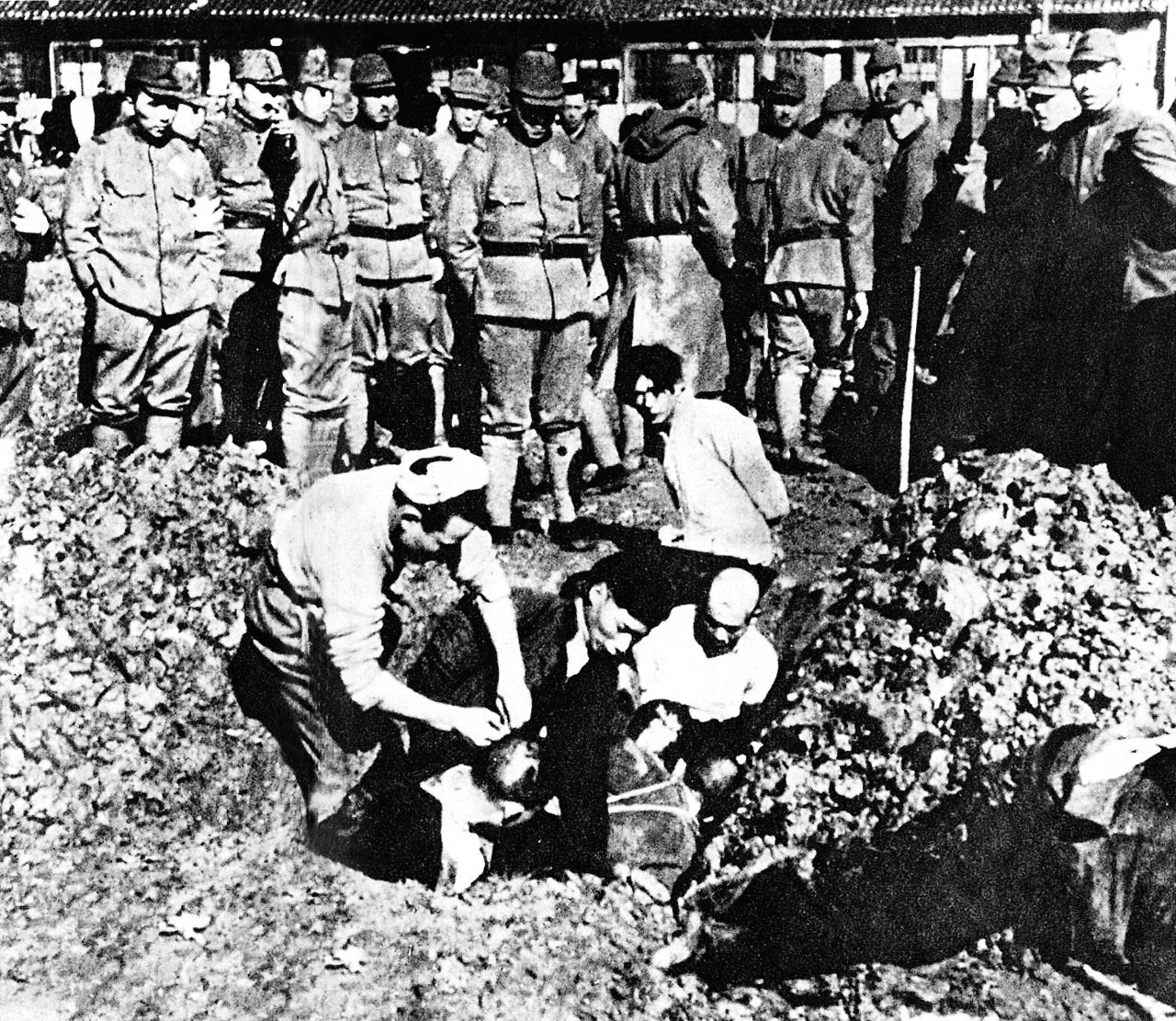
During the Nanjing Massacre, Japanese soldiers forced Chinese civilians into pits to be buried alive.

Starting on 13 December 1937, soldiers in the Imperial Japanese Army carried out the Nanjing Massacre in Nanjing, the capital of the Republic of China. The massacre lasted into January 1938 and killed numerous people (hundreds to hundreds of thousands according to Japanese publications, or over 300,000 according to most Chinese historians). (Note: See Death toll of the Nanjing Massacre for discussion.) This constituted a crime under international law, for which the perpetrators were tried in the International Military Tribunal for the Far East and the Nanjing War Crimes Tribunal after World War II.

In the 1990s, overseas Chinese such as Lin Boyao, Lin Tongchun, Chen Xianzhong, Shao Ziping and others suggested that Chinese leaders participate in the annual Nanjing local public ceremonies. A group of experts and scholars from the Second Historical Archives of China, Jiangsu Academy of Social Sciences, Nanjing University, and Nanjing Normal University also proposed to raise the level of commemorative activities to show respect for the lives of the victims and responsibility for history. Writer Haixiao, former chairman of the Jiangsu Provincial Writers' Association, suggested that 13 December be designated as the "Nanjing People's Day of Mourning for Compatriots in Distress and Not Forgetting National Enmity and Family Hatred". Beginning in 1996, each year on 13 December, the Nanjing air defense office would test air raid sirens throughout the city, to remind people not to forget China's national humiliation and to strengthen Nanjing residents' feeling towards national defense and their awareness of air defense.

In 2004, Zhao Long, then deputy director of the Standing Committee of the Jiangsu Provincial People's Congress, visited the Memorial Hall for Compatriots in Distress and had the idea of proposing the establishment of a National Public Sacrifice Day at a Chinese People's Political Consultative Conference (CPPCC) meeting. It was also suggested that 13 December of each year should be legally fixed as the National Public Ceremony Day and public ceremonies should be held in the presence of national leaders. The proposal was co-signed by 49 members and widely reported by the media. Zhao Long was the first member of the CPPCC to propose that 13 December be established as the National Public Offering Day.

In 2012, Takashi Kawamura, the mayor of Nagoya, Japan, made remarks denying the Nanjing Massacre. In the same year, the Japanese government announced the intention to purchase Diaoyu Islands, and in March 2012, at the Fifth Session of the Eleventh National Committee of the CPPCC, Zhao Long, as a member of the Standing Committee of the CPPCC and the Chairman of the Jiangsu Committee of the China National Democratic Construction Association, once again submitted a motion on the Nanjing Massacre. At the same time, during the Fifth Session of the Eleventh National People's Congress, Zou Jianping, President of the Nanjing Arts Institute, put forward three proposals: "building a memorial garden for the victory in the war", "criminalizing Nanjing Massacre denial" and "holding a national public memorial service on the day of sacrifice of compatriots killed in the Nanjing Massacre".

In December 2013, Japanese Prime Minister Shinzo Abe visited the Yasukuni Shrine, triggering opposition from people in China and South Korea, and Chinese Foreign Ministry spokesman Qin Gang said that Abe "should go to the Memorial Hall for the Victims of the Nanjing Massacre of the Japanese Army". After that, Xinhua News Agency reporters Cai Yugao and Jiang Fang came to the Memorial Hall several times to interview the victims, and based on this, they wrote an "internal reference", which attracted the attention of the central leadership.

== Legislative process ==
=== Drafting ===
On the eve of the Spring Festival on 22 January 2014 the State Law Office of the Legislative Affairs Commission of the Standing Committee of the National People's Congress (NPC) received a legislative task to draft a decision on the establishment of a national memorial day for the Nanjing Massacre. On 26 January the Director of the Third Division of the State Law Office, Wang Shuguang, called the Memorial Hall of the Victims in Nanjing Massacre by Japanese Invaders, requesting the latter to provide two 3,000-word written materials. On the same day, the Memorial Hall prepared two textual materials, "Explanation on the History of the Nanjing Massacre" and "Brief Introduction to the Activities Organized by Jiangsu Province and Nanjing Municipality over the Years to Commemorate the Compatriots Victims of the Nanjing Massacre". These materials became the initial material for the National Public Sacrifice Act.

Wang Shuguang and his colleagues formed two drafts of the Decisions. On the afternoon of 4 February 2014 Zheng Shuna, deputy director of the Standing Committee of the National People's Congress Standing Committee on Legal Affairs, Guo Linmao, inspector of the State Law Office, Wang Shuguang, director of the Third Division of the State Law Office, Zhang Jing, a cadre of the State Law Office, and the five staff members of the Memorial Hall for the Victims of the Massacre (including the director Zhu Chengshan) convened a symposium in the Memorial Hall. On 5 February the Memorial Hall helped the National People's Congress to organize and revise the "Explanation on the History of the Nanjing Massacre". In the 36 days from 22 January to 27 February the State Law Office drafted a total of 10 reports to the Central Committee and the Standing Committee, 7 legal documents for the Standing Committee's consideration, and 3 publicity programs and outlines; it also compiled and prepared 14 briefings and 12 references of various kinds; the written materials amounted to 41 pieces of material. After consultation with experts and thematic debates, the draft bills were submitted to the Standing Committee of the Twelfth National People's Congress for a vote at its seventh session.

=== Deliberations ===
On the afternoon of 25 February 2014 the seventh meeting of the Standing Committee of the 12th National People's Congress (NPC) opened at the Great Hall of the People, with Chairman Zhang Dejiang presiding over the meeting. The meeting considered the draft decision of the NPC Standing Committee on the determination of the Memorial Day for the Victory of the Chinese People's War of Resistance Against Japanese Aggression and the draft decision of the NPC Standing Committee on the establishment of a national public mourning day for the victims of the Nanjing Massacre. Li Shishi, head of the Legal Affairs Commission of the NPC Standing Committee, made a presentation on the two draft decisions to the meeting. The draft decision establishes 13 December as a national public memorial day for the victims of the Nanjing Massacre."

On 25 February the seventh meeting of the Standing Committee held a group meeting to consider the two draft decisions. Participants were fully in favor of the explanations and draft decisions of the two bills, and unanimously recommended that the draft decisions be referred to this meeting of the Standing Committee for deliberation and adoption. On the afternoon of 27 February the 19th meeting of the Standing Committee of the 12th National People's Congress was held, and heard a report from Qiao Xiaoyang, the Chairman of the Legal Committee, on the deliberations on the drafts of the "two decisions" proposed for voting. On the same day, the 7th meeting of the Standing Committee voted the adopted decision of the Standing Committee on determining the anniversary of the Victory of the Chinese People's War of Resistance against Japanese Aggression, as well as the establishment of Nanjing Massacre Memorial Day. The "two decisions" were unanimously adopted by the 165 people attending the Standing Committee meeting, a rare occurrence in Standing Committee voting matters.

== National observance ==
=== First national observance (2014) ===
On 27 February 2014, the Standing Committee of the 12th National People's Congress voted at their seventh meeting to pass the "Decision of the Standing Committee of the National People's Congress Regarding the Establishment of a National Memorial Day for the Nanjing Massacre Victims" (全国人民代表大会常务委员会关于设立南京大屠杀死难者国家公祭日的决定), establishing Nanjing Massacre Memorial Day as the 13th of December annually.

The first national observance of Nanjing Massacre Memorial Day was on 13 December 2014. The Central Committee of the Chinese Communist Party, the Standing Committee of the National People's Congress, the State Council, the National Committee of the CPPCC, and the Central Military Commission held the "Nanjing Massacre Memorial Day ceremony" at the Nanjing Massacre Memorial Hall in Nanjing. According to state media, an estimated 10,000 people were at the ceremony. Throughout the city, people honked car horns to honor the victims. The ceremony was led by Politburo Standing Committee member and NPC Standing Committee chair Zhang Dejiang. Communist Party general secretary Xi Jinping, Nanjing Massacre survivor Xia Shuqin (夏淑琴), and Young Pioneer Ruan Zeyu (阮泽宇, a descendant of Nanjing Massacre victims) unveiled the National Memorial Tripod (dǐng, 国家公祭鼎), and Xi gave a speech. He called for friendly relations between China and Japan despite the painful history being commemorated, saying, "We should not bear hatred against an entire nation just because a small minority of militarists launched aggressive wars." This speech has become an important text in Xi Jinping Thought.

On the same day, the government of Hong Kong held a memorial ceremony at the Hong Kong Museum of Coastal Defence. Hong Kong Chief Executive Leung Chun-ying attended the ceremony and gave a wreath as an offering. The government of Macau held a memorial event at the College of Macao Security Forces. Macao Liaison Office director Li Gang, Macau chief executive Fernando Chui, CPPCC vice chair Edmund Ho, special commissioner at the Office of the Commissioner of the Ministry of Foreign Affairs of the People's Republic of China in the Macao Special Administrative Region Hu Zhengyue, and Macao Garrison commander Wang Wen (王文) presented wreaths. Other commemorative events were held in other parts of China.

=== Continued observance ===
Flag-lowering ceremony held on the National Memorial Day for the Victims of the Nanjing Massacre on 13 December 2018.

Nanjing Massacre Memorial Day has been observed annually since 2014, with ceremonies at the Nanjing Massacre Memorial Hall. The ceremony begins with the Chinese national anthem. Sirens go off at 10:01 a.m. CST, and drivers stop and honk their horns. The Chinese flag is flown at half-mast, ceremony attendees wear dark clothing with white flowers, and white doves are released to represent peace. Sixteen soldiers leave eight wreaths of chrysanthemums, a traditional flower for mourning. The ceremony also includes a speech from a Politburo leader and the reading of a "Peace Declaration". The observance is accompanied by extensive coverage in Chinese state media and is attended by Communist Party officials as well as by elderly survivors of the massacre.

President Xi Jinping attended the 2017 ceremony, which marked the 80th anniversary, in addition to the inaugural 2014 event. In addition, every anniversary has been attended by a CCP Politburo member, except the 85th anniversary in 2022, which was attended by Politburo Standing Committee member Cai Qi. Although the memorial day is named after the Nanjing Massacre, its honorees are not limited to victims of that massacre. Instead the day is to commemorate all who were killed during the era of the Second Sino-Japanese War, including victims of the Nanjing Massacre, victims of chemical weapons, victims of biological warfare, victims of forced labor, comfort women, victims of the Three Alls policy, and victims of indiscriminate bombing.

== See also ==
- Martyrs' Day (China)
- Unit 731
- Victory over Japan Day
