= Martyrdom in China =

The concept of martyrdom in China during the premodern period largely concerned loyalty to political principles and was developed in modern times by revolutionaries, such as the Tongmenghui and the Kuomintang parties during the 1911 Revolution, Northern Expedition, and Second Sino-Japanese War.

== Martyrdom and loyalty ==
In pre-imperial China, the honest official Qu Yuan remonstrated with his king but was driven out of the court by vicious rivals. Rather than rebel, he drowned himself in the river, leaving behind his poem, Li Sao (Encountering Sorrow). His failed attempt in 228 BCE to assassinate the King of Qin, who would become the First Emperor of China, made Jing Ke a martyr. The state can prosecute those who slander officially designated martyrs under the Law on the Protection of Heroes and Martyrs.

== Christian martyrs ==
Christian missionaries and Chinese Christians were mostly accepted along with other religious persuasions but sometimes accused of disloyalty. Government officials executed Christians in the 18th and 19th centuries for their refusal to renounce their faith, which the officials regarded as subversive. The largest number of martyrs were those killed by local groups in the Boxer Uprising, when some 30,000 Chinese citizens and foreign missionaries were killed because their faith was considered foreign.

== Modern development ==
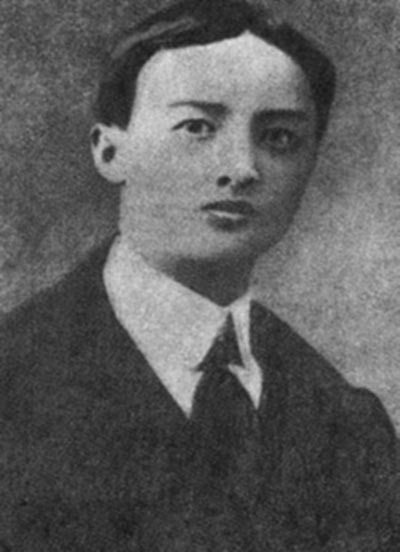
Yu Peilun (1887 - 1911) who was martyred leading a suicide squad against Qing forces in the Xinhai Revolution.

Revolutionaries of the Tongmenghui who died in attempts to overthrow the Qing dynasty were recognized as martyrs by the Republic of China after the Xinhai Revolution.

During the Xinhai Revolution itself, many Chinese revolutionaries became martyrs in battle. "Dare to Die" student corps were founded, for student revolutionaries wanting to fight against Qing dynasty rule. Dr. Sun Yatsen and Huang Xing promoted the Dare to Die corps. Huang said, "We must die, so let us die bravely". During the revolution, suicide squads were formed by Chinese students going into battle, knowing that they would be killed fighting against overwhelming odds. The 72 Martyrs of Huanghuagang died in the uprising that began the Wuchang Uprising, and were recognized as heroes and martyrs by the Kuomintang party and the Republic of China. Dare to Die student corps led by men like Chiang Kai-shek and Huang Shaoxiong with Bai Chongxi played a role in the attack against Qing forces in the Xinhai Revolution. The martyrs in the Dare to Die Corps who died in battle wrote letters to family members before heading off to certain death. The Huanghuakang was built as a monument to the 72 martyrs. The martyrdom of the revolutionaries helped the establishment of the Republic of China, overthrowing the Qing dynasty imperial system.

"Dare to Die" corps continued to be used in the Chinese military. The Kuomintang used one to put down an insurrection in Canton. Many women joined them in addition to men to achieve martyrdom against China's opponents.

The Kuomintang continued to promote the concept of martyrdom, the souls of Party martyrs who died fighting for the Kuomintang and the revolution and the party founder Dr. Sun Yatsen were sent to heaven according to the Kuomintang party. Chiang Kai-shek believed that these martyrs witnessed events on earth from heaven and he called on them for help.

Among those recognized as martyrs for the Chinese Communist Party (CCP) were the Five Martyrs of the Left League, members of the League of Left-Wing Writers who were arrested and executed in 1931 during the KMT's White Terror at a secret meeting along with nineteen other CCP members and sympathizers.

Among the PRC's post-revolution martyrs was Zhang Zhixin. Zhang was celebrated in the after the Cultural Revolution as a hero who stood up to those like the Gang of Four.

Company bosses against the Chinese Communist Revolution ordered workers in "Dare to Die Corps" to fight for their organizations, with their lives. During the 1989 Tiananmen Square protests and massacre, protesting students also formed "Dare to Die Corps", to risk their lives defending the protest leaders.

=== Revolutionary martyrs in art ===
Two of the earliest revolutionary martyrs in Chinese culture were Liu Hulan, a 14-year-old school girl, and Jiang Zhuyun. Both were immortalized in operas - Liu Hulan and Sister Jiang respectively.

== Honorary title ==
Martyr is an honorary title for those who officially sacrificed their lives for a just cause or sacrificed their lives for justice. In the Ming dynasty, the Great Ming Code stipulated that actors were not allowed to play loyal martyrs, and those who violated the law would be punished. In the People's Republic of China, martyrs were formerly called "revolutionary martyrs", referring to Chinese citizens (including members of the People's Liberation Army) who "died heroically in the revolutionary struggle, defending the motherland and socialist modernization construction". In addition, according to the "Several Explanations on Revolutionary Martyrs" issued by the Ministry of Internal Affairs of the Central People's Government in 1950, those who died in battle, were executed by the authorities of, or died in prison for opposing the Qing dynasty, the Beiyang government, the Nationalist government, and the Japanese invaders before the founding of the People's Republic of China were also regarded as "revolutionary martyrs." In 2011, the "Regulations on Commendation of Martyrs" was promulgated and implemented, and "revolutionary martyrs" were renamed "martyrs".

== Islam ==
Islam has its own concept of martyrdom, which the Kuomintang promoted among Chinese Muslims through the Chinese Muslim Association. The Muslim General Ma Fuxiang stated on how Chinese Muslims were willing to die to accomplish tasks assigned to them. Imams sponsored by the Kuomintang called for Muslims to go on Jihad to become shaheed (Muslim term for martyr) in battle, where Muslims believe they will go automatically to heaven. Becoming a shaheed in the Jihad for the country was encouraged by the Kuomintang, which was called "glorious death for the state" and a hadith promoting nationalism was spread. A song written by Xue Wenbo at the Muslim Chengda school, which was controlled by the Kuomintang, called for martyrdom in battle for China against Japan. The Muslim General Bai Chongxi himself was a member of a Dare to Die corps in the Xinhai revolution.

== See also ==
- Martyrs' shrines (China)
- The Chinese Martyrs, Christian martyrs in China
