= Mount Langya (Hebei) =

Mountain in Hebei province, China

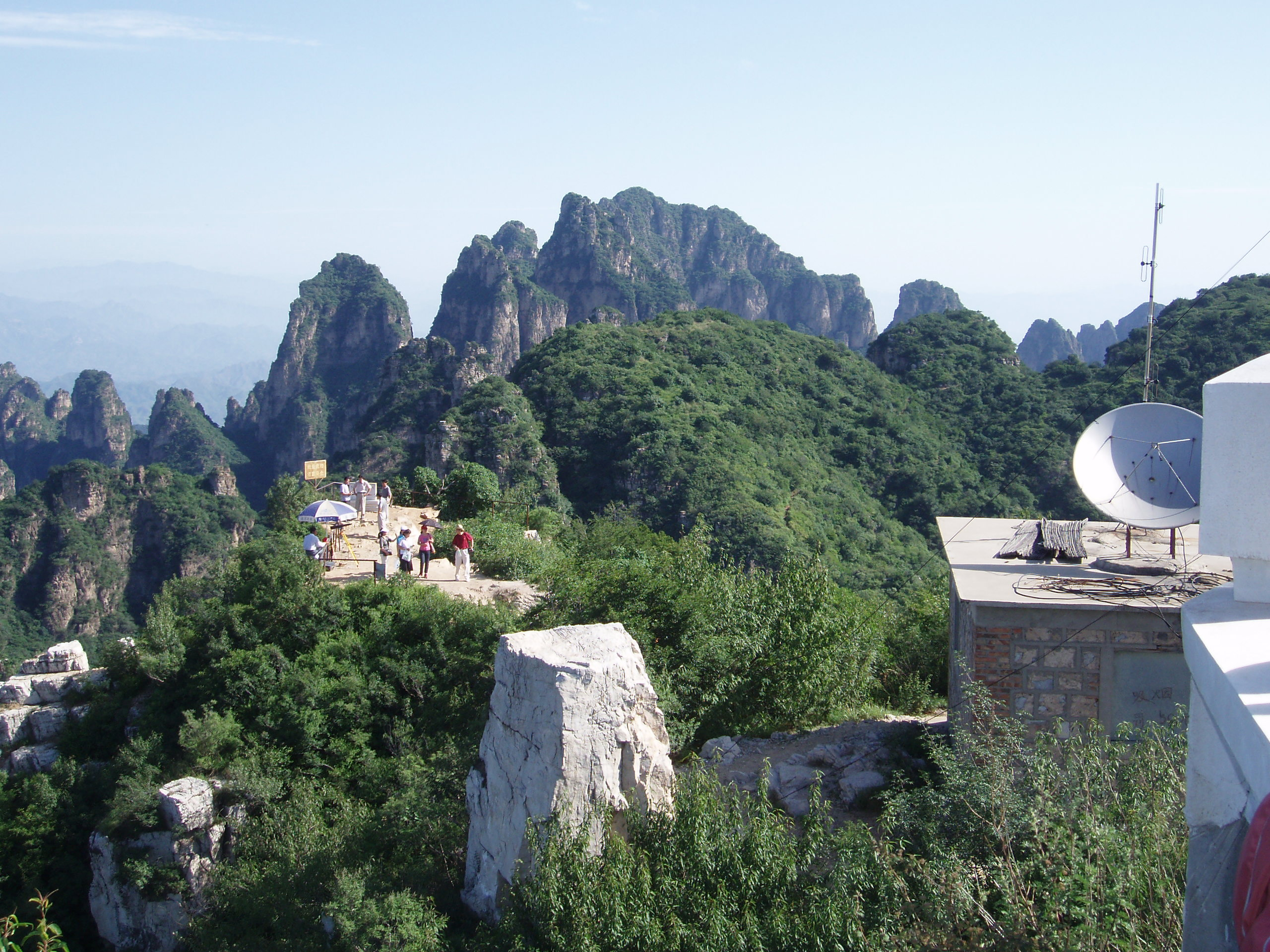

Highest point
- Coordinates: 39°7′44.9″N 115°11′8.97″E

Geography
- Location within China
- Country: People's Republic of China
- Province: Hebei
- County: Yi

Mount Langya (Chinese: 狼牙山; pinyin: Lángyáshān; lit. 'Wolf-tooth Mountain') is a mountain located in Yi County, Hebei province about 290 kilometres (180 mi) southwest of Beijing.

== Five heroes of Mount Langya ==
According to the mythology of the Chinese Communist Party, the "five heroes of Mount Langya" (simplified Chinese: 狼牙山五壮士; traditional Chinese: 狼牙山五壯士; pinyin: Lángyáshān wǔ zhuàngshì) were five men who fought the Imperial Japanese Army atop Mount Langya during the Second Sino-Japanese War. They supposedly killed dozens and then committed suicide by throwing themselves off the top of the mountain to escape capture by the Japanese. Two of the Chinese soldiers survived, but all others perished. The story is celebrated in China; a Chinese court has written that the heroes and their story reflect "the national sentiments, historical memories and the national spirit" and are important "sources and components of modern China’s socialist core values". The story has been made into a movie.

=== Myth disputed ===
Hong Zhenkuai, a Chinese historian, has disputed the myth, saying that the five men had slipped rather than jumped, and that they had not in fact killed any Japanese soldiers. Jiang Keshi, a professor at Okayama University in Japan, found in a search of Japanese military records that no soldiers had died in their encounter with the five on Langya. Publishing doubts about the historicity of the official account of the story has been implicated in the closure of the magazine Yanhuang Chunqiu in 2016. A court decided in 2016 that the historian behind the article, Hong Zhenkuai, had defamed the heroes and was ordered to publicly apologize.

== Gallery ==
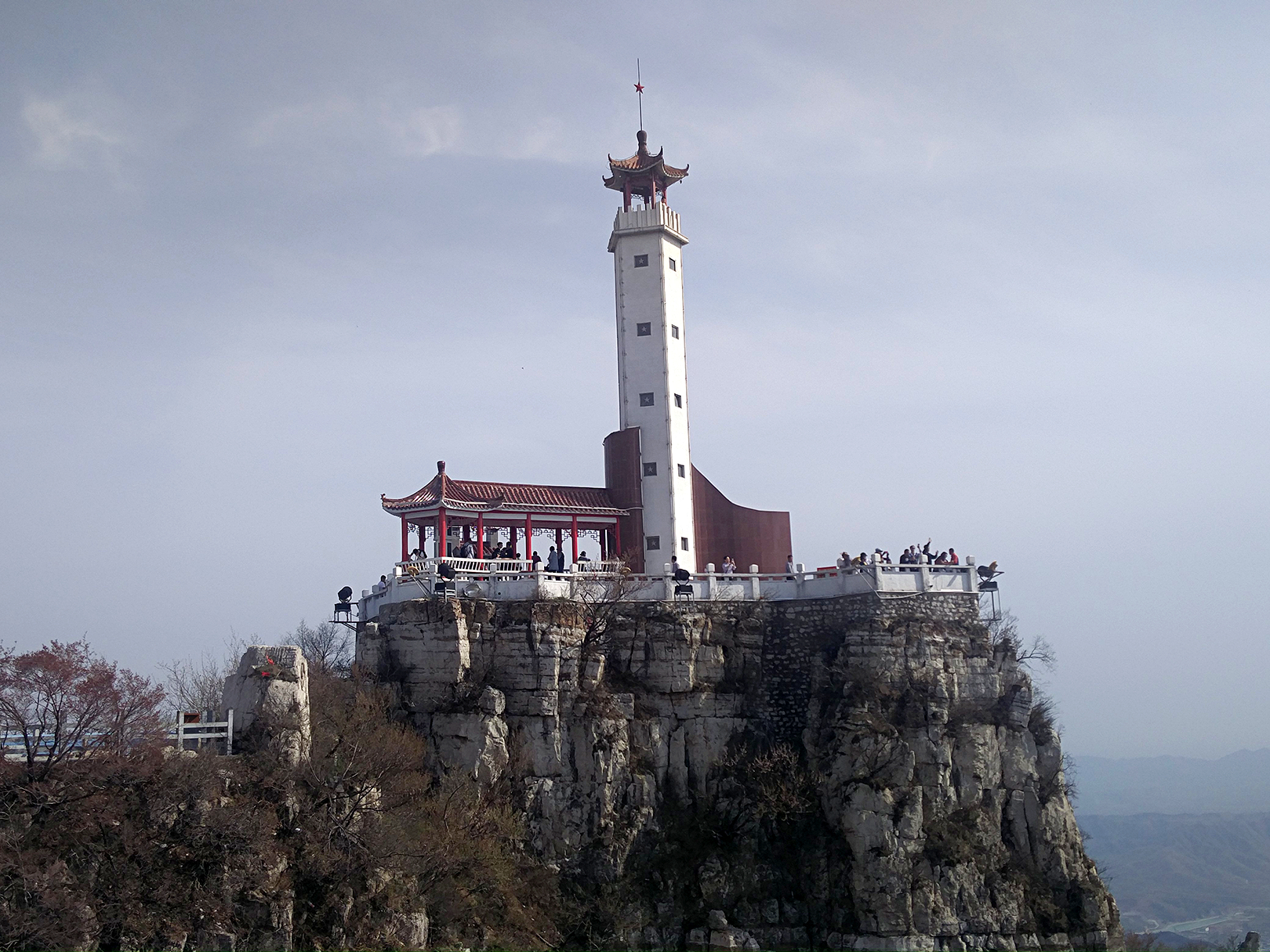
A pavilion at the top of Mount Langya

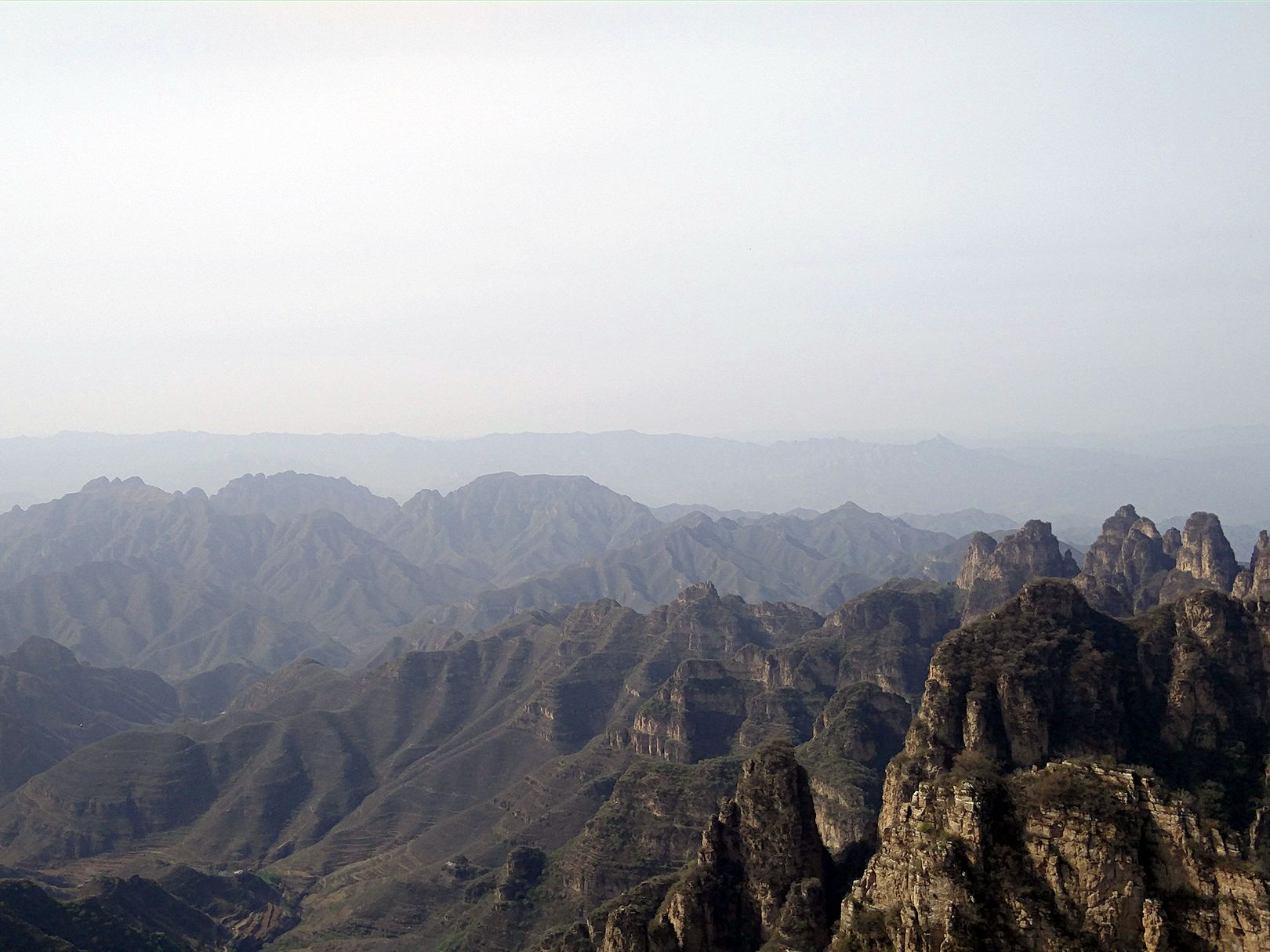
A rolling vista of Mount Langya

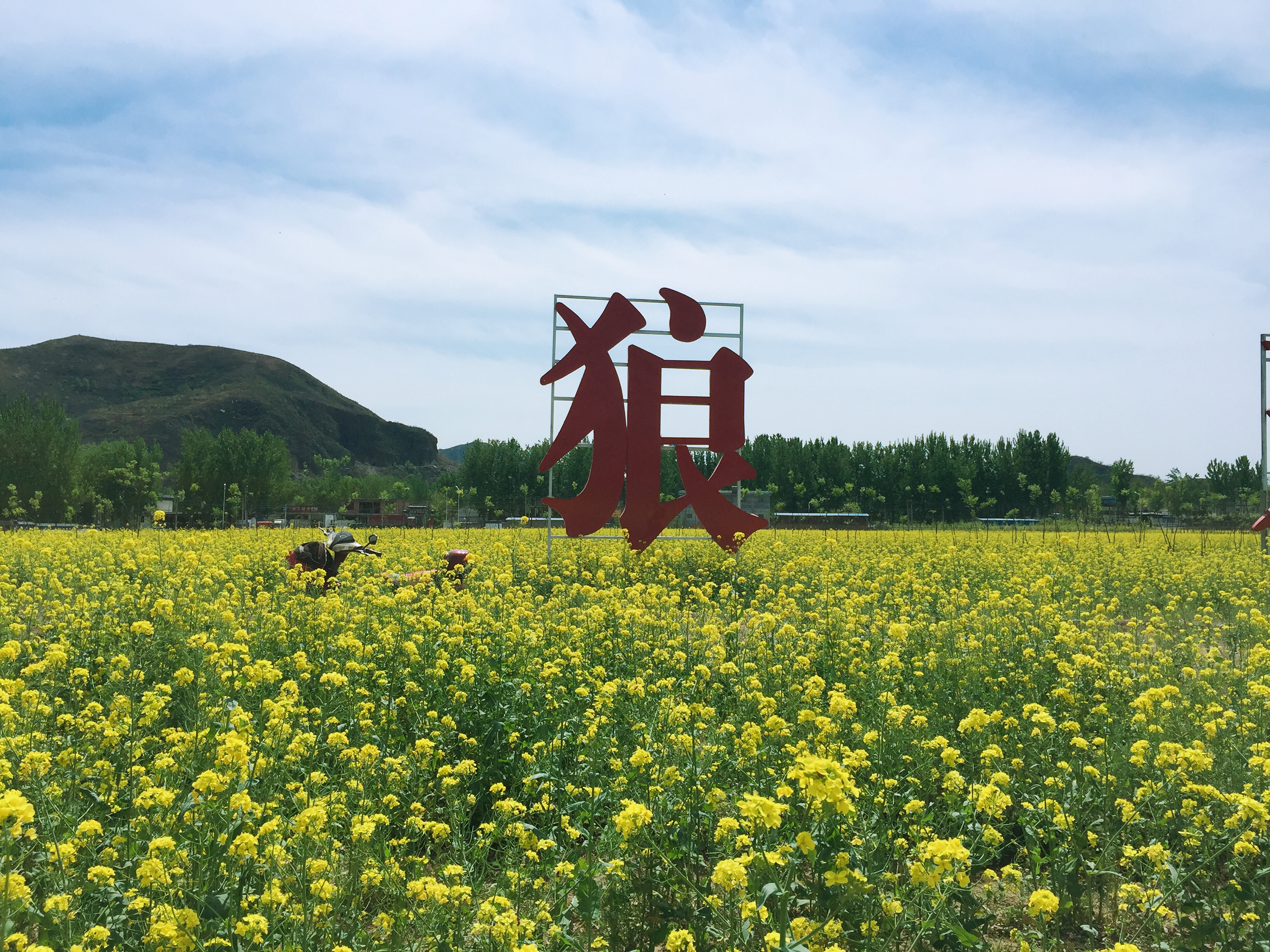
A field of yellow rapeseed flowers in Mount Langya, with a sign of the first character lang of Mount Langya's name

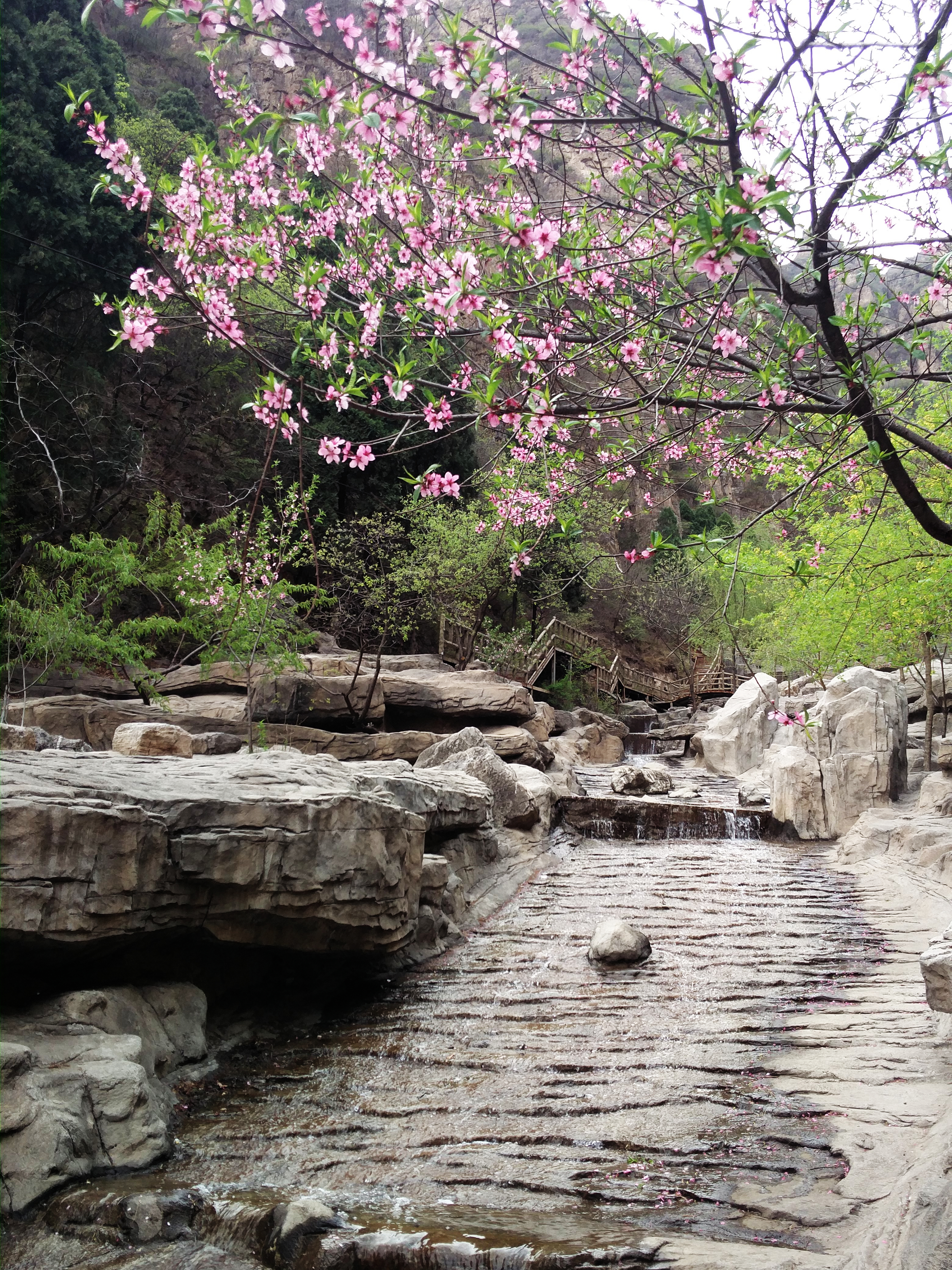
A stream at the foot of Mount Langya

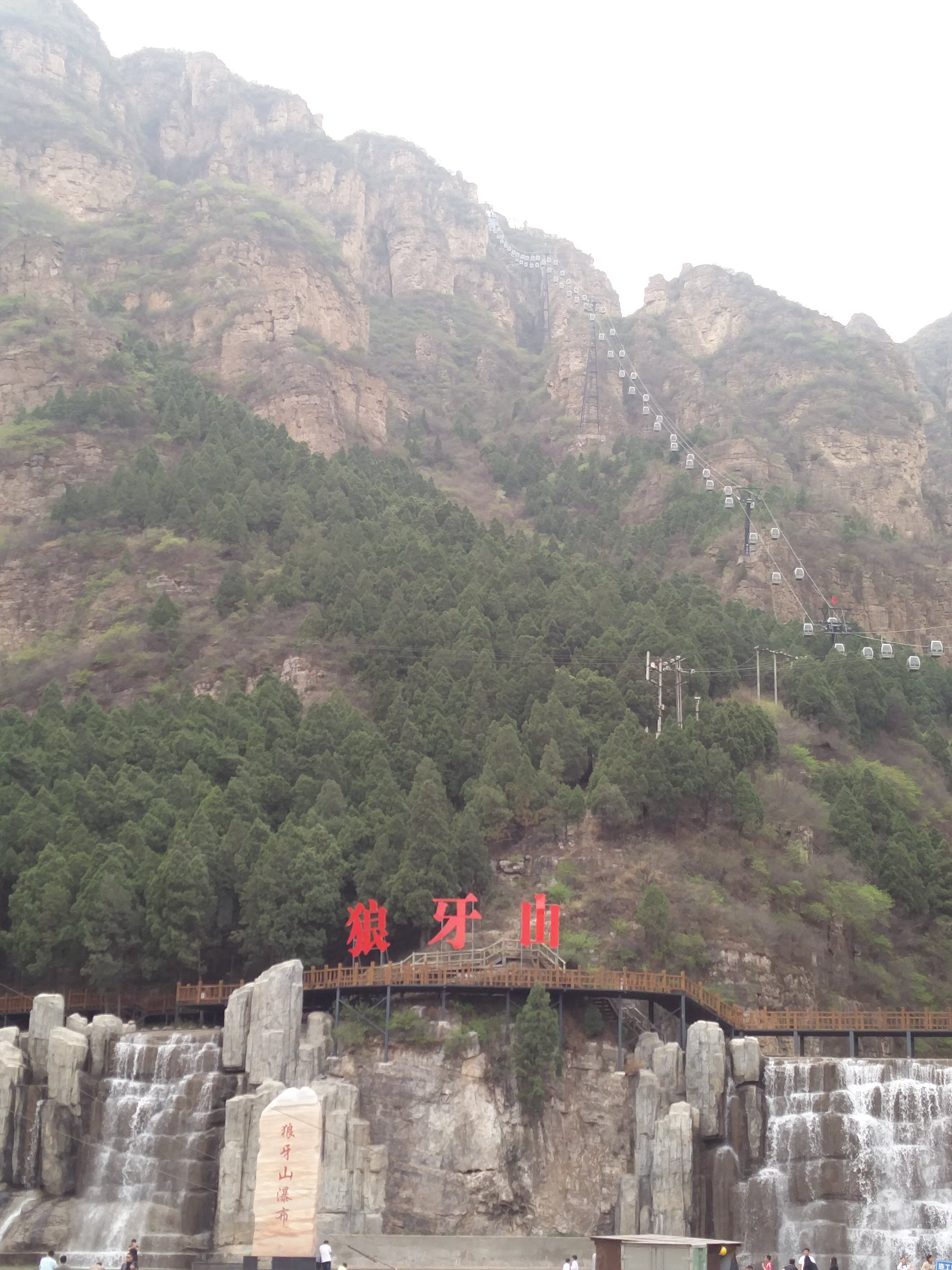
Mount Langya in Hebei

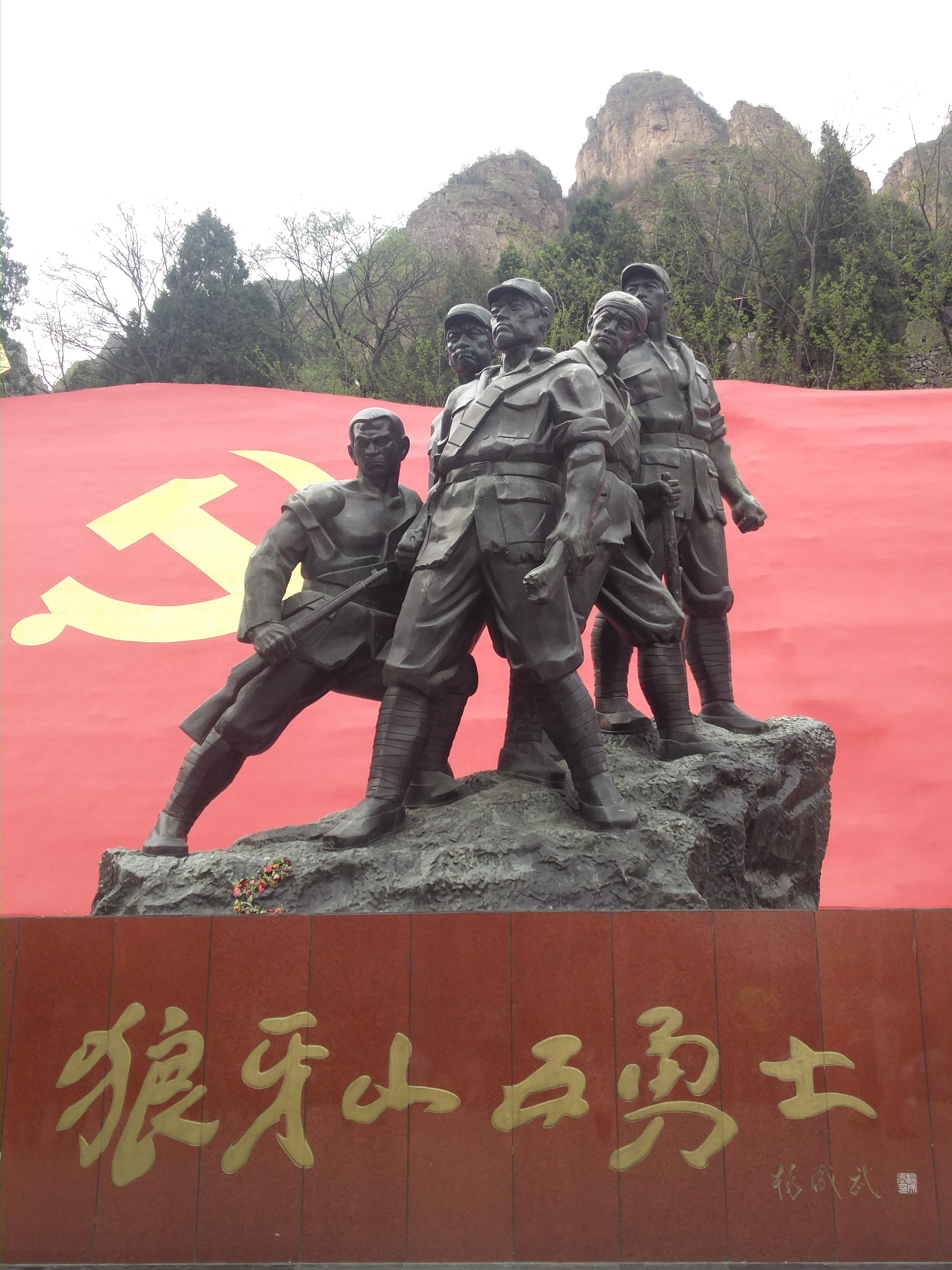
Statues of Five Heroes on Mount Langya

== See also ==
- Mount Langya (Anhui)
