= Death toll of the Nanjing Massacre =

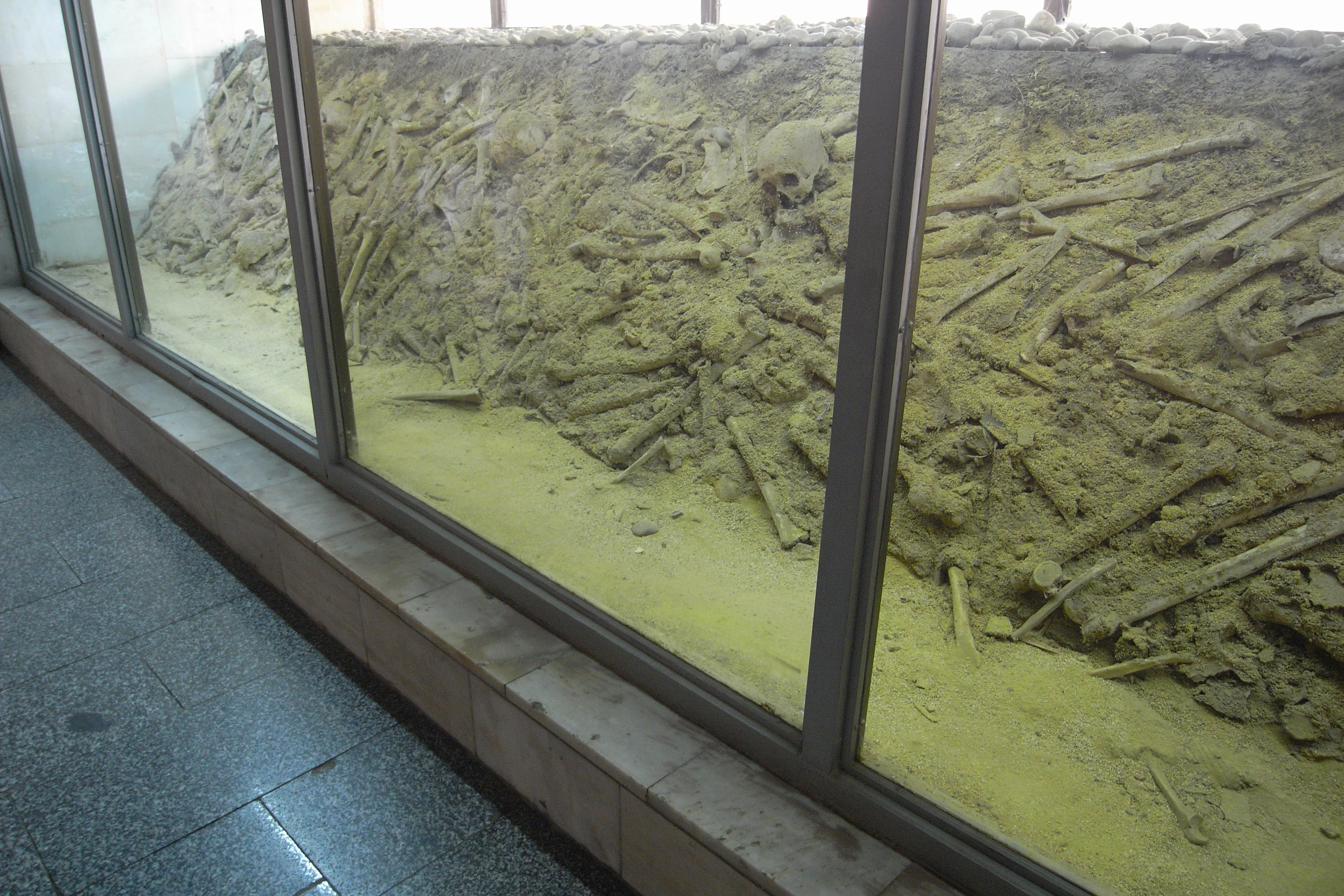
A mass grave from the Nanjing Massacre

The total death toll of the Nanjing Massacre is a highly contentious subject in Chinese and Japanese historiography. Following the outbreak of the Second Sino-Japanese War, the Japanese Imperial Army marched from Shanghai to the Chinese capital city of Nanjing, and though a large number of Chinese POWs and civilians were slaughtered by the Japanese following their entrance into Nanjing on December 13, 1937, the precise number remains unknown. Since the late-1960s when the first academic works on the Nanjing Massacre were produced, estimating the approximate death toll of the massacre has been a major topic of scholarly debate.

Currently, the most reliable and widely agreed upon figures place the massacre victims within Nanjing City Walls to be around 50,000, mostly massacred in the first five days from December 13, 1937; while the total victims massacred as of the end of March 1938 in both Nanjing and its surrounding six rural counties far exceed 100,000 but fall short of 200,000. Hence, depending on the timeframe and the geographic scope, an empirically verifiable, scholarly valid victimization range is from over 40,000 to under 200,000.

The center of the debate rests on the validity of burial records and oral history. A lesser debate rests on who among the dead should be included as "massacre victims". Numbers smaller or larger than the empirically verifiable, scholarly valid victimization range have been put forward by Japanese revisionists and the Chinese Communist Party. Some of the lowest estimates have counted only 10,000 deaths, while the government of China maintains that approximately 300,000 people were killed.

== Background ==
In July 1937, war broke out in northern China between China and Japan, and by August the fighting had spread to the city of Shanghai. After capturing Shanghai the Japanese Army decided on December 1 to continue its military campaign to the capital city of the Nationalist government of China, Nanjing, which is roughly 300 kilometers west of Shanghai. Although the Japanese succeeded in surrounding Nanjing and defeating the Chinese garrison stationed there by December 13, few of the Chinese soldiers within the city formally surrendered. Instead they threw away their uniforms and weapons and hid among the city's civilian population. Over the course of its subsequent occupation of Nanjing the Japanese Army hunted down the former Chinese soldiers within the city and in a large number of cases summarily executed them. At the same time soldiers of the Japanese Army also committed random acts of murder against civilians, and engaged in torture, rape, arson, and looting. These events are collectively known as the Nanjing Massacre.

== Early estimates ==
The Nanjing Massacre was reported internationally within a week of occurring and the first estimate of the full death toll was published on January 24, 1938, in the New China Daily. Here Australian journalist Harold Timperley was quoted as stating that 300,000 civilians had been killed. However, Timperley's source for this number was the French humanitarian Father Jacquinot, who was in Shanghai at the time of the massacre, and it might also have included civilian casualties of the Battle of Shanghai. Timperley included a second estimate in his book published later the same year, Japanese Terror In China, which quoted "a foreign member of the University faculty" as stating that "close to 40,000 unarmed persons were killed within and near the walls of Nanking". The source of this information was Miner Searle Bates, an American resident in Nanjing who had used the burial records of the Red Swastika Society in his calculations.

These same estimates were commonly cited by reporters and the media. In his 1941 book The Battle for Asia, Edgar Snow states that 42,000 were massacred in Nanjing and 300,000 in total between Nanjing and Shanghai. The 1944 film The Battle of China claims 40,000 were killed in the Nanjing Massacre.

Another early estimate was that of China's state-run Central News Agency, which reported in February 1938 that the Japanese had slaughtered 60,000 to 70,000 POWs in Nanjing. The same month a representative of the Nationalist Government of China claimed that the Japanese had killed 20,000 civilians during the Nanjing Massacre. However, in a 1942 speech Chiang Kai-shek raised that figure to "over 200,000 civilians". In 1938 the Red Army of the Chinese Communist Party reported the total death toll at 42,000 massacred. John Rabe, the German head of the International Committee for the Nanking Safety Zone, estimated that between 50,000 and 60,000 Chinese were killed in Nanjing.

After the end of the war between China and Japan in 1945, these estimates were in turn supplanted by the findings of two war crime trials, the International Military Tribunal of the Far East and the Nanjing War Crimes Tribunal. In one estimate the Nanjing War Crimes Tribunal put the death toll at more than 300,000, though the Tribunal also recorded other estimates including one of 430,000. The International Military Tribunal of the Far East tallied up 155,000 victims of the massacre, though in their verdict against General Iwane Matsui this figure was modified somewhat to "upwards of 100,000 people". However, the prosecution at these trials made little effort to verify the accuracy of their death toll estimates and a considerable amount of dubious and now discredited data was accepted by both tribunals.

The first historian to make an academic estimate of the death toll of the Nanjing Massacre was Tomio Hora in his 1967 book Kindai Senshi no Nazo ("Riddles of Modern War History"), who argued in favor of 200,000. Since then the death toll of the massacre has been a major topic of discussion among historians across the world. However, emotional arguments and political interference in the debate have tended to hinder the construction of an academic consensus on the number of people killed in the atrocity.

== Sources and application ==
David Askew, a historian at Ritsumeikan University, states that the death toll of the Nanjing Massacre can be calculated by modern-day historians on the basis of four types of sources. The first type of source is oral history, but he calls this "the most problematic methodology in researching the incident" due in part to large discrepancies between the testimony of Japanese and Chinese eyewitnesses.

The second type of source is the burial records written down by Chinese charitable associations. The IMTFE stated that a total of 155,300 corpses were buried in and around Nanjing after the fall of the city, based on statistics from the Red Swastika Society and the Chongshantang, though many historians now discount the accuracy of the burials recorded by the Chongshantang. Consequently, Askew estimates that the true number of corpses buried in and around Nanjing was 17,500, whereas military historian Masahiro Yamamoto puts the number at 43,000. By contrast, Kasahara generally supports the higher burial estimates presented at the IMTFE, though he concedes that not all of the Chongshantang's figures can be accepted "at face value". However, both Kasahara and Yamamoto have noted that burial records can be problematic in ways that can exaggerate or underestimate the true death toll of the massacre. On the one hand, burial statistics combine massacre victims with Chinese combat casualties and thus exaggerate the death toll. On the other hand, they fail to include corpses that were destroyed rather than buried and thus underestimate the death toll.

The third type of source is Japanese military records, which recorded the number of POWs the Japanese Army executed. However, Askew notes that Japanese units often exaggerated their body counts. When Yoshiaki Itakura, an independent writer who became one of the leading researchers of the Nanjing Incident, analyzed the records of the Japanese Army, he multiplied his final tally by 0.6 in order to account for exaggeration and reached the total of 13,000 to 19,000 massacre victims. Though Ikuhiko Hata has also used Japanese military records to calculate the death toll of the massacre, he does not account for exaggeration as Itakura did. Bob Wakabayashi, a historian at York University, found out on the basis of the records of the Japanese Army alone could prove that at very least 29,240 people, or more likely 46,215 people, were massacred by the Japanese in Nanjing in the opening weeks; when considering evidence other than military records, Wakabayashi concluded the total deaths in Nanjing and its neighbouring six rural counties in a 3-month period to be "far exceed 100,000 but fall short of 200,000".

Japanese military records are a valuable source for estimating the number of Chinese POWs massacred by Japanese soldiers, but the number of civilians massacred is more difficult to determine. The final type of source mentioned by David Askew is data sampling, and though only one such survey of this variety was conducted, Lewis S.C. Smythe's "War Damage in the Nanking Area", it is an essential document for estimating civilian casualties of the atrocity. According to Smythe's survey, as many as 12,000 civilians were killed within the city of Nanjing plus another 26,870 in the rural counties outside Nanjing. However, some historians have variously argued that Smythe's figures are either underestimates or exaggerations of the true civilian death toll. On the one hand, Kasahara asserts that the survey substantially underestimated the death toll, partly because Smythe only surveyed inhabited homes and thus skipped over the homes of families who had been entirely destroyed or been unable to return. By contrast, Minoru Kitamura argues that Smythe's links to the Nationalist Government of China may have led him to skew his figures upwards.

In addition, the total civilian population of Nanjing in December 1937 and the size of the Chinese garrison defending the city are used as a basis for calculating the death toll, though the matter is complicated due to greatly varying estimates for both of these numbers. For instance, Tokushi Kasahara claims that Nanjing's population in 1937 included 400,000 to 500,000 civilians and 150,000 soldiers, whereas David Askew believes it was 200,000 to 250,000 civilians and 73,790 to 81,500 soldiers.

In his final analysis, Tokushi Kasahara looks at documents and diaries recorded by soldiers of the Japanese Army and concludes that at least 80,000 Chinese soldiers and POWs, or possibly over 100,000, were massacred by the Japanese, which was most of the estimated total force of 150,000 soldiers. Kasahara notes that Smythe's survey proves that a bare minimum of 12,000 ordinary civilians were massacred within Nanjing, though other contemporary sources gives figures between 50,000 and 100,000, plus at least another 26,870 outside Nanjing. Kasahara generally concludes that the death toll must have been well over 100,000, and possibly around 200,000. His more specific range of figures is roughly 160,000 to 170,000.

By contrast, Ikuhiko Hata also examined the Japanese Army's documents and tallied up a total of 30,000 Chinese POWs massacred out of a total Chinese force of 100,000. Hata takes Smythe's figure of 12,000 civilians killed, but notes that perhaps only 8,000 were confirmed massacre victims. Hata discounts estimates of the death toll which range into the hundreds of thousands on the basis that, according to Smythe, Nanjing's civilian population was only between 200,000 and 250,000. In light of the 40,000 corpses which Hata believes were buried in and around Nanjing, he estimates the total death toll at between 38,000 and 42,000 POWs and civilians.

== Debate on the scope of the massacre ==
In reference to the greatly divergent ways in which various scholars have delineated the massacre, Askew has affirmed that the debate on the death toll "is meaningless if two completely different definitions are being used". Noting that different definitions produce vastly different estimates, he believes that even the significant disagreements between the historians Tokushi Kasahara and Ikuhiko Hata would disappear if they had been using the same definitions.

=== Chinese soldiers and POWs as massacre victims ===
The first academic accounts of the Nanjing Massacre included as massacre victims all Chinese who were killed by the Japanese Army in and around Nanjing, including Chinese soldiers who were killed in action. This definition was supported by Hora and other early scholars. In 1986 Ikuhiko Hata became the first historian to call this definition into question. Hata argued that Chinese troops killed on the battlefield were part of the Battle of Nanking rather than Nanjing Massacre, and that only civilians and disarmed POWs should be counted as massacre victims.

Since then Kasahara has proposed a definition between these two. He agrees with Hata that Chinese soldiers actively engaged in combat were not massacre victims, but he also includes in his definition of the massacre any Chinese soldiers who were killed on the battlefield but not actively resisting, noting that many confrontations between the Chinese and Japanese Armies were more like one-sided slaughters than battles. For instance, after routing the Chinese in Nanjing, Japanese soldiers fired upon and killed a large number of Chinese soldiers who were attempting to escape the battlefield by swimming across the Yangtze River. Many historians including Kasahara view incidents like these where the Japanese fired upon retreating troops to be atrocities, whereas Hata sees them as extensions of combat and not massacres.

By contrast Yoshiaki Itakura adopted an even stricter standard than Hata, advocating that only Chinese soldiers captured in uniform and then killed be included as massacre victims. He argued that Chinese soldiers who had thrown away their uniforms were legally executed because the laws of war at the time did not apply to them, though this line of reasoning is hotly disputed by other historians. Most Japanese ultranationalists who deny the Nanjing Massacre admit that the Japanese Army killed a large number of Chinese POWs, though they consider these to be legal executions, an argument denounced by mainstream historians.

=== Geographic range and duration ===
The International Military Tribunal for the Far East stated that the massacre took place in the parts of Nanjing captured on December 13, 1937, and after and lasted until early February 1938. Though many still support the IMTFE's geographic scope for the massacre, in 1984 the journalist Katsuichi Honda became the first individual to voice disapproval of this definition. Honda argued that the Japanese Army's atrocities had not suddenly started when the Japanese reached the city of Nanjing proper on December 13, but rather were part of a continuous process which started soon after the Japanese Army left Shanghai early in November. Honda believes all those atrocities that were committed on "the road to Nanjing" were part of the massacre.

Then in 1997 Kasahara formulated a definition between the two. He reasoned that the Nanjing Massacre should include the entire area of what was then known as the "Nanking Special Administrative District". This district encompassed not only the city of Nanjing proper, occupied by the Japanese from December 13, but also the six rural counties surrounding it, namely Jiangning, Lishui, Jurong, Jiangpu, Luhe, and Gaochun. This definition, though considerably larger than the IMTFE's, keeps the massacre contained to "Nanjing" without including cities on the outskirts of Shanghai like Suzhou and Wuxi which Honda does include. Kasahara believes that including massacre victims from the surrounding rural parts of Nanjing adds 30,000 victims onto the death toll.

However, the expansion of the definition of the Nanjing Massacre to include areas outside of Nanjing has not been without controversy. The argument in favor of this made by Katsuichi Honda in 1984 was seen by some scholars involved in the debate on the massacre as a "partial admission of defeat" by Honda. In their view Honda, who had previously put forward the idea that more than 100,000 people were murdered in the city of Nanjing alone, was failing to prove his argument and therefore sought to extend the boundaries of the massacre until a larger figure for the death toll could be achieved. French historian Jean-Louis Margolin, for instance, has strongly criticized Honda's argument, noting that "As, in our present knowledge, it is impossible to get convincing figures for such large areas, such methods may be considered as attempts to blur hopelessly the debate."

Apart from geographical scope, some historians including Kasahara deny that the massacre ended in early February and instead put the end date at March 28, though such a long time range is disputed by other historians. On the other hand, at least one historian has noted that the atrocity in Nanjing could be equated with the entire war waged by Japan on China. By this definition the "Nanjing Massacre" can symbolically be said to have lasted from 1931 to 1945, extended over the whole of China, and included ten million victims.

== Japanese views ==
In the early 1970s, Japanese historian Hora's estimate of 200,000 massacre victims was challenged for the first time by the journalist Akira Suzuki, who suggested that "several tens of thousands" had been killed. Soon after some denialists claimed that no massacre had taken place at all. Nanjing Massacre studies in Japan eventually became divided into three camps based on their death toll estimates: the "illusion" school of Nanjing Massacre deniers, the "great massacre" school which believes hundreds of thousands were killed, and the "middle-of-the-road" or "centrist" school which puts the number in the tens of thousands.

However, when Shokun! magazine surveyed members of each "school" for their opinions on the massacre, many of the so-called "centrists" advocated extremely low figures for the total number of victims, including Dokkyo University professor Akira Nakamura, journalist Yoshiko Sakurai, and researcher Toshio Tanabe, who each counted about 10,000 massacred, and military historian Takeshi Hara who selected 20,000. In reviewing this survey, Askew concluded that all of its "centrists" were effectively deniers of the atrocity except for Hara. By contrast, Bob Wakabayashi sets the bar higher and believes that the estimate of 40,000 victims put forward by Ikuhiko Hata is the lowest reasonable estimate of the total death toll and considers numbers below this to be attempts at minimizing the atrocity. Today, most Japanese historians of the so-called "great massacre" school have reduced their death toll estimates somewhat and now advocate the figure of "100,000 plus" in contrast with the old consensus of 200,000. Historians Haruo Tohmatsu and HP Willmott think that Japanese scholars generally consider the estimate of roughly 40,000 massacre victims to be "the most academically reliable estimate".

== Stance of the Chinese government ==
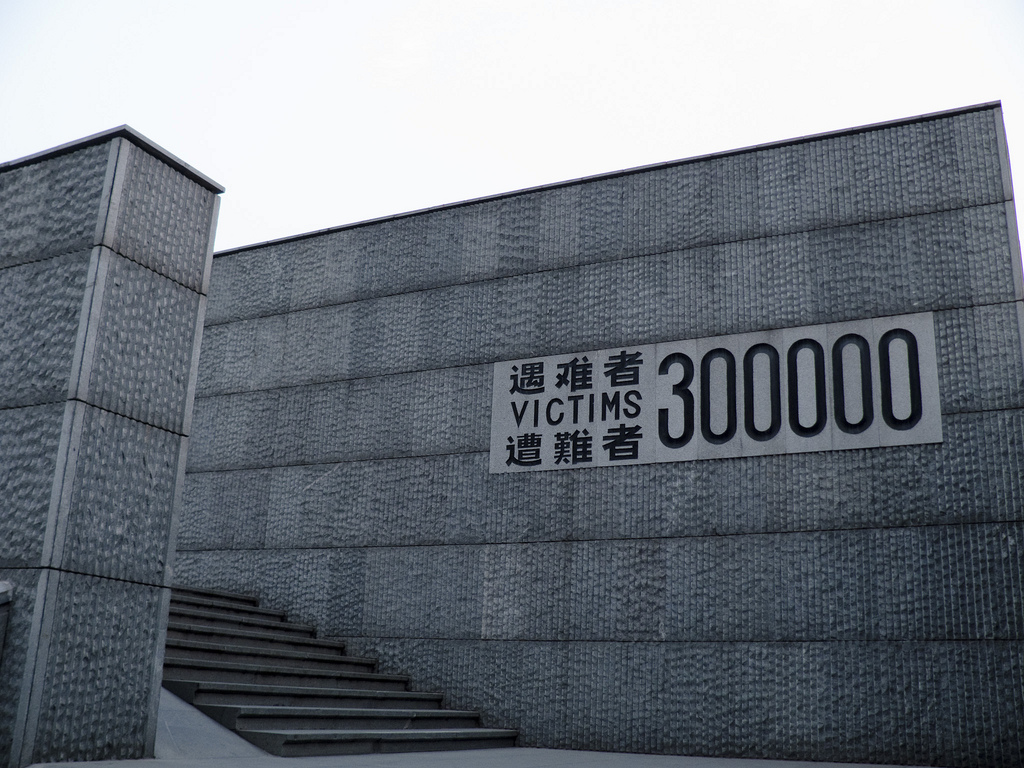
The figure of 300,000 victims is written in stone at Nanjing Massacre Memorial Hall.

The official stance of the People's Republic of China is that 300,000 or more Chinese were massacred in Nanjing. Initially, this figure was generally accepted as including both massacre victims and Chinese soldiers killed in combat, though during the 1980s it came to be interpreted as including only massacre victims.

Today, many mainstream historians concur that this estimate is exaggerated. The figure was originally based on the verdict of the Nanjing War Crimes Tribunal which added the burial records of 155,300 bodies with 72,291 destroyed corpses to arrive at a total of 279,586, though there was an apparent adding mistake in this calculation. Furthermore, this estimate includes an accusation that the Japanese Army murdered 57,418 Chinese POWs at Mufushan, though the latest research indicates that between 4,000 and 20,000 were massacred, and it also includes the 112,266 corpses allegedly buried by the Chongshantang, though today many historians agree that the Chongshantang's records were at least exaggerated if not entirely fabricated. Bob Wakabayashi concludes from this that estimates over 200,000 are not credible. Ikuhiko Hata considers the number of 300,000 to be a "symbolic figure" representative of China's wartime suffering and not a figure to be taken literally.

Nevertheless, the Chinese government has maintained a hard line on its estimate of 300,000 victims. Within China scholars focus on defending the official figures and in the past the government has imposed censorship on historians who have suggested alternative numbers. Joshua A. Fogel, a historian of China at York University, has decried the efforts of many Chinese to exaggerate the death toll of the atrocity and then "silence anyone who disagrees".

In 2006, Kaz Ross, a historian with the University of Tasmania, anonymously interviewed a number of university researchers in the city of Nanjing to learn their private views on the death toll of the Nanjing Massacre. She found that Chinese historians favor estimates between 40,000 and 150,000 and that they "speculated that reducing the official Chinese estimate of victims would pave the way for greater reconciliation between Japan and China". However, they feared that speaking out openly "would be detrimental to their careers". In contrast with the People's Republic of China, the official history of the Second Sino-Japanese War released by the Republic of China states that the death toll of the massacre was "more than 100,000 people".

== Western views ==
By the year 2000, very little research had been done by Western scholars concerning the death toll of the Nanjing Massacre, and instead most Western sources simply repeated the early death toll estimates, including those proposed in the 1930s and 1940s by the International Military Tribunal of the Far East, which put the toll at 100,000 or more, and by Miner Searle Bates, who said roughly 40,000.

In The Cambridge History of China, historian Lloyd Eastman asserted that the death toll was "at least 42,000".

According to Canadian political scientist David Bruce MacDonald, the higher range of estimates of over 100,000 victims are more likely to be accurate, whereas by contrast, the Irish historian LM Cullen argues that the lower range of estimates, which put the death toll in tens of thousands, "are probably the most credible". According to historian Jonathan Fenby, the most recent research places the death toll at 100,000 or less.

== Death toll estimates ==
Currently, the most reliable and widely agreed upon figures place the total death toll of the massacre between the broad range of 40,000 to 200,000 massacre victims in the entire Nanjing Special Administrative District. Some individual estimates by scholars and eyewitnesses are included in the following table.

| Individual or group | Estimate of total massacred | Civilians massacred | Soldiers massacred | Notes on the killing of Chinese soldiers | Area and duration under consideration | References |
|---|---|---|---|---|---|---|
| Sun Zhaiwei | 400,000 | | | | | |
| Government of the People's Republic of China | 300,000 | | | | only the city of Nanjing | |
| Akira Fujiwara | 200,000 | | | includes all Chinese killed including those killed in action | the city of Nanjing, its immediate outskirts, and all six surrounding counties between early December 1937 and late January 1938 | |
| Tokushi Kasahara | 160,000-170,000 | 80,000-90,000 | 80,000 | includes all disarmed POWs; includes soldiers killed on the battlefield but not immediately capable of fighting back | the city of Nanjing, its immediate outskirts, and all six surrounding counties between December 4, 1937, and March 28, 1938 | |
| Yutaka Yoshida | 100,000+ | | | includes all disarmed POWs; includes soldiers killed on the battlefield but not immediately capable of fighting back | the city of Nanjing, its immediate outskirts, and all six surrounding counties between December 1, 1937, and March 1938 | |
| Katsuichi Honda | 100,000+ | | | | the entire area from Shanghai to Nanjing, between November 1937 to late January 1938 | |
| Keiichi Eguchi | 100,000+ | | | includes all disarmed POWs; does not include any soldiers killed on the battlefield | the entire area from Shanghai to Nanjing between November 1937 to late January 1938 | |
| Jean-Louis Margolin | 50,000-90,000 | 30,000 | 30,000-60,000 | includes all disarmed POWs; does not include any soldiers killed on the battlefield | the city of Nanjing and its immediate outskirts between December 13, 1937, and early February 1938 | |
| Masahiro Yamamoto | 15,000-50,000 | 5,000-20,000 | 10,000-30,000 | includes all disarmed POWs; does not include any soldiers killed on the battlefield | the city of Nanjing and its immediate outskirts between December 13, 1937, and early February 1938 | |
| Ikuhiko Hata | 40,000 | 10,000 | 30,000 | includes all disarmed POWs; does not include any soldiers killed on the battlefield | the city of Nanjing and its immediate outskirts between December 13, 1937, and early February 1938 | |
| Miner Searle Bates and Lewis Smythe | 42,000 | 12,000 | 30,000 | only includes disarmed POWs buried by the Red Cross, and civilians whose deaths they verified; does not include any soldiers killed on the battlefield | the city of Nanjing and its immediate outskirts between December 13, 1937, and late January 1938 | |
| Kaikosha | 32,000 | 16,000 | 16,000 | includes all disarmed POWs; does not include any soldiers killed on the battlefield | the city of Nanjing and its immediate outskirts between December 13, 1937, and early February 1938 | |
| Takeshi Hara | 20,000-30,000 | several thousand | about 20,000 | includes all disarmed POWs; does not include any soldiers killed on the battlefield | the city of Nanjing and its immediate outskirts between December 13, 1937, and late January 1938 | |
| F. Tillman Durdin | 20,000 | | 20,000 | includes all disarmed POWs; does not include any soldiers killed on the battlefield | the city of Nanjing and its immediate outskirts between December 13, 1937, and early January 1938 | |
| Minoru Kitamura | 20,000 | | about 20,000 | includes all disarmed POWs; does not include any soldiers killed on the battlefield | the city of Nanjing and its immediate outskirts between December 13, 1937, and early January 1938 | |
| Yoshiaki Itakura | 13,000-19,000 | 5,000-8,000 | 8,000-11,000 | does not include approximately 4,000 Chinese soldiers captured out of uniform and executed; does not include any soldiers killed on the battlefield | the city of Nanjing and its immediate outskirts between December 13, 1937, and early February 1938 | |

== Concerns about victim counts ==
The debate on the death toll has gone on for many decades to the point where some historians have begun to question its usefulness on the grounds that excessive quibbling over the precise death toll has distracted from the study of other more important facets of the massacre. Daqing Yang, a historian at George Washington University, believes that "an obsession with figures reduces an atrocity to abstraction and serves to circumvent a critical examination of the causes of and responsibilities for these appalling atrocities" and Carol Gluck concurs that "The crucial historical question remains the moral one: how could ordinary Japanese have done what they did? Numerological arguments about the death count and distinctions of comparative atrocities do not address this point." However, Masahiro Yamamoto printed a rebuttal of Gluck's statement in his book Nanking: Anatomy of an Atrocity, arguing that "To determine the extent and nature of [Japan's] responsibility, the 'numerological arguments about the death count and distinctions of comparative atrocities,' which [Gluck] termed as irrelevant to the moral question, are essential. Only after firmly establishing 'historical particularities' can one clearly define Japan's responsibility. And based on a clear definition of the responsibility there can be an answer to the 'moral' question."

== See also ==
- Second Sino-Japanese War
- Nanjing Massacre
- Nanjing (1937－1945)
