= Minoru Kitamura =

Japanese historian

Minoru Kitamura (北村稔, Kitamura Minoru; born 1948) is a Japanese historian. He is a professor at Ritsumeikan University whose academic speciality is modern Chinese history.

== Life and career ==
He was born in Kyoto Prefecture. He completed his bachelor's degree with a major in modern history at the Department of Humanities at Kyoto University in 1973. He initially dropped out of a doctorate program at the same university but in 1999 finally attained his doctorate in law. He worked as an assistant professor at Mie University before taking up his current post at the humanities department of Ritsumeikan University. He is also a member of the Japan Association for Nanjing Studies and an associate researcher at the Japan Institute for National Fundamentals.

== The Politics of Nanjing: An Impartial Investigation ==
In 2001 his book Nankin Jiken no Tankyū: Sono Jitsuzō wo Motomete was published by Bungeishunju (later translated into English as The Politics of Nanjing: An Impartial Investigation). In the book he analyzes the Nanjing Massacre in an attempt to use historical methods to verify the "war crime" verdict pronounced at the Tokyo Trials and the Nanjing War Crimes Tribunal. Though on the one hand he confirms using newly discovered data the massacre of less than 20,000 Chinese POWs by the Japanese army, he concludes through analysis of many types of Chinese and Allied wartime propaganda that the perception of the war crimes tribunals, that a huge massacre of ordinary civilians had occurred reaching hundreds of thousands of deaths, was gradually invented after 1937. He undertook his research asking the question of how false perceptions about the massacre arose while seeking "a return to the basics of historical research".

He alleges that Harold Timperley, an Australian journalist stationed in China who accused the Japanese army of committing atrocities in Nanking and in many other places in China, engaged in international propaganda work for the Kuomintang (KMT) Central Information Department from immediately after the outbreak of the Second Sino-Japanese War and published the edited volume "What War Means" with the KMT's financial support. Kitamura cites "A Biographical Dictionary of Foreigners in China in the Modern Age" written in 1981 by the Chinese Social Sciences Publishing Co., which states that "in 1937, after the Marco Polo Bridge Incident, the KMT dispatched [Timperley] to Europe and the United States to engage in propaganda activities", as well as the memoirs of Zeng Xubai, the head of the KMT Central Information Department, who is quoted by Wang Lingxiao, the author of "The KMT's News Administration Policy", as saying, "we decided that our first step would be to make payment to Timperley, and also, through his coordination, to Smythe, and commission both of them to write and publish two books for us as witnesses to the Nanking Massacre".

=== Praise ===
In the January 2002 issue of Shokun! magazine Kitamura's thesis was reviewed favorably by Yoshiko Sakurai, Akira Suzuki, Mizuho Ishikawa, and Kenichi Ara.

Shudo Higashinakano bolstered Kitamura's argument in 2003 following the discovery of a top-secret document written in 1941 called "An Overview of Propaganda Operations of the International Information Division of the Central Information Department of the Nationalist Party: from 1938 to April 1941". The document lists Timperley's "What War Means" as a KMT propaganda book.

=== Criticism ===
The August 2, 2002, edition of Shūkan Kin'yōbi presented the criticisms and negative opinions of Hisashi Inoue, Bob Tadashi Wakabayashi, Haruki Watanabe, and of Tokushi Kasahara, who labelled Kitamura as a "denier of the Nanjing Massacre".

Hisashi Watanabe criticized Kitamura's thesis in the official bulletin of the Association of Returnees from China, acknowledging problems with the testimony of Zeng Xubai who, for instance, mistakenly reminisced that Timperley was present in Japanese-occupied Nanjing, and also suggesting that Zeng Xubai did not explicitly state a working relationship between Timperley and the KMT Central Information Department, which was only Wang Lingxiao's interpretation. In addition, Hisashi Inoue has argued that Zeng Xubai's claim to have commissioned Timperley was an error. A document of the KMT Central Information Department from the Second Historical Archives of China in Nanjing instead reads "We bought up as well as printed first-hand accounts of the Japanese army's massacre at Nanjing, one by Timperley himself and, by means of him, another by Smythe."

Based on the essays written by Watanabe and Inoue, in 2007 Tokushi Kasahara concluded that "The autobiography of Zeng Xubai is self-serving and unreliable", and he furthermore pointed to Kitamura's greatest "trick" as his attempt to make his readers think that Timperley wrote the 1938 volume "What War Means" as a Chinese spy before he had actually become a KMT agent in 1939. He also attacked Kitamura on the matter that "He doesn't have a clue about how legal trials work, and he thought that the judges wrote their verdict while quoting from Timperley's book without even being able to distinguish the difference between an indictment and a verdict".

== Other works ==
Kitamura's book Daiichiji Kokkyōgassaku no Kenkyū: Gendai Chūgoku wo Keisei Shita Nidai Seiryoku no Shutsugen ("Research on the First United Front: The Emergence of the Two Great Powers that Constitute Modern China") was published by Iwanami Shoten in 1998. He explains in detail the trends of the Chinese Nationalist Party and the Chinese Communist Party that have moved modern China, centering on the establishment, development, and collapse of the cooperative relationship which they forged over the course of the Nationalist Party's unification of China which was tentatively completed in 1928.

In his book Chūgoku wa Shakaishugi de Shiawase ni Natta no ka ("Has Socialism Made China Happy?"), published by the PHP Institute in 2005, he argues that "The essence of the People's Republic of China is a feudalistic dynasty socialist in name only."

In 2008 the PHP Institute published a book he co-wrote with Lin Siyun entitled Nicchū Sensō: Sensō wo Nozonda Chūgoku, Nozomanakatta Nihon, translated into English as "The Reluctant Combatant: Japan and the Second Sino-Japanese War". In the book Kitamura and Siyun contemplate various aspects of the Second Sino-Japanese War and seek to refute the standard assumptions that "Japan waged a war of aggression and China was Japan's hapless victim".

== Translations ==
Kitamura is a translator of Chinese and English who had translated into Japanese the works by Jerome Chen, Stuart R. Schram, Ray Huang, and Li Changping.

== See also ==
- Historiography of the Nanking Massacre
