= Akira Suzuki (writer) =

Japanese non-fiction writer and freelance journalist

Akira Suzuki (鈴木 明, Suzuki Akira, 28 October 1929 – 22 July 2003) was the pen name of Japanese non-fiction writer and freelance journalist Akio Imai.

== Life and career ==
He was born in Tokyo and graduated from the Department of Humanities at Rikkyo University. After serving as a reporter at the magazine “Shūkan Taimuzu," he joined TBS where he did program scheduling work and was chief editor of the TBS-published magazine “Chōsa Jōhō." His book Nankin Daigyakusatsu No Maboroshi ("The Illusion of the Nanjing Massacre"), which he wrote while working at TBS, won the 4th Soichi Oya Nonfiction Award in 1973. Including the paperback edition, it sold 200,000 copies. Afterwards, he left TBS and became a freelance writer.

He died of heart failure on 22 July 2003.

== The Illusion of the Nanjing Massacre ==
In this book, Suzuki concludes that Harold Timperley who edited the book What War Means from his reports and articles on Japanese atrocities in China, was a secret propaganda agent advising the KMT.

He also denies the hundred man killing contest.

In a special edition of Shokun magazine, Suzuki argued that estimating the number of victims accurately would be impossible. Though he has been classified as middle of the road in the debate on the massacre, the historian Tokushi Kasahara has criticized him as “a central member of the Nanjing denial faction”.

=== Criticism ===
Some criticized Suzuki’s methods of collecting data and others said, regarding the Mufushan Massacre, a component of the Nanjing Massacre in which POWs were slaughtered, that he used fabricated interviews with officers who were never at the site of the killings. It was notably alleged that former officer Sadaharu Hirabayashi, who later became president of the veterans’ association Senyukai, made statements of dubious credibility to Suzuki and in addition was not actually present at Mufushan.

== Works ==
- 『「南京大虐殺」のまぼろし』 （文藝春秋、1973年） （文春文庫、1983年11月）ISBN 4167197022 （文藝春秋1983年刊の新版、WAC、2006年6月）ISBN 4898315461
- 『証言中国・台湾・沖縄－政治とマスコミの空白を追って』 （光風社書店、1974年）
- 『誰も書かなかった台湾』 （サンケイ新聞社出版局, 1974年）
- 『リリー・マルレーン を聴いたことがありますか』 （文藝春秋、1975年） （文春文庫、1978年4月） （文藝春秋、1988年2月）ISBN 4163420908
- 『そしてわが歌 もう一つの＜リリー・マルレ－ン＞をたずねて』 （TBSブリタニカ、1976年）
- 『秘録・謀略宣伝ビラ ― 太平洋戦争の"紙の爆弾"』 （鈴木明、山本明 編著、講談社、1977年12月）
- 『高砂族 に捧げる』 （中央公論社、1976年、中公文庫、1980年8月）
- 『続・誰も書かなかった台湾 天皇が見た"旧帝国"はいま』 （サンケイ出版、1977年3月）
- 『誰も書かなかった毛沢東 "赤い巨星"の謎の部分』 （サンケイ出版、1977年12月）
- 『昭和20年11月23日のプレイボ－ル』 （集英社、1978年） （光人社、2001年12月）ISBN 476981030X
  - 増補改題『日本プロ野球復活の日－昭和20年11月23日のプレイボール』 （集英社文庫、1987年4月） ISBN 4087492117
- 『その声は戦場に消えた』 （文藝春秋、1978年8月）
- 『アウシュヴィツからの旅 こんなふうに世界を歩いてみた』 （講談社、1979年6月）
- ジャイアンツ は死なず』 （読売新聞社、1979年12月）
- 『コリンヌはなぜ死んだか』 （文藝春秋、1980年4月）
- 『わが マレーネ・ディートリヒ 伝』 （潮出版社、1980年10月、小学館ライブラリー、1991年8月）ISBN 4094600078
- 『今、プロ野球 を斬る対論』 （作品社、1981年3月）池井優 との対談
- 『歌謡曲 ベスト1000の研究』 （TBSブリタニカ、1981年9月）
- 『愛国』 （文藝春秋、1982年8月）
- 『ある日本男児とアメリカ 東善作 明治二十六年生まれの挑戦』 （中公新書、1982年11月）
- 『プロ野球を変えた男たち』 （新潮社、1983年8月）ISBN 4103474017
  - 改題『セ・パ分裂プロ野球を変えた男たち』（新潮文庫、1987年10月）ISBN 4101048118
- 『ジャン・ギャバン と呼ばれた男』 （大和書房、1983年11月）ISBN 4479760032 （小学館ライブラリー、1991年10月）ISBN 4094600094
- 『追跡 一枚の 幕末 写真 長編ノンフィクション』 （集英社、1984年7月）ISBN 4087724921 （集英社文庫、1988年9月）ISBN 4087493857
- 『戦場の神の子たち』 （中央公論社、1985年4月）ISBN 4120013898
- 『響け！アジアの鼓動 台湾・香港・韓国 国境を越えた「魂の歌」』 （PHP研究所、1985年7月）ISBN 4569215726
- 『ああ台湾 郭泰源 たちのふるさと』 （講談社、1985年9月）ISBN 4062023431
- 『維新前夜― スフィンクス と34人のサムライ』 （小学館、1988年6月）ISBN 4093870233 （増訂版、小学館ライブラリー、1992年2月）ISBN 4094600183
- 『中国にも革命が起きる』 （文藝春秋、1990年3月）ISBN 4163441409
- 『台湾に革命が起きる日』 （リクルート出版、1990年10月）ISBN 4889912037
- 『ジャーナリズムの原点はゴシップである』 （マゼラン出版、1992年9月）ISBN 4905582024
- 『イヴ・モンタン ―20世紀の華麗な幻影』 （毎日新聞社、1993年6月）ISBN 4620309419
- 『明治維新畸人伝―かつて、愛すべき「変な日本人」がいた』 （勁文社文庫、1993年10月）ISBN 4766918738
- 『1936年 ベルリン 至急電―「東京、遂に勝てり!」』 （小学館、1994年10月）ISBN 4093871124 （小学館ライブラリー、1997年6月）ISBN 4094601007
- 『波 1980-1999』 （三才ブックス、1999年6月）ISBN 4915540502
- 『新「南京大虐殺」のまぼろし』 （飛鳥新社、1999年6月）ISBN 4870313685
- 『日本畸人伝－明治・七人の侍』 （光人社、2000年10月）ISBN 4769809778

== See also ==
- Contest to kill 100 people using a sword
- Historiography of the Nanjing Massacre
