= Yoshiaki Itakura =

Yoshiaki Itakura (板倉 由明, Itakura Yoshiaki; 1932–1999) was a Japanese businessman and researcher of military history born in Kanagawa Prefecture. He is most well known for his research and denial on the Nanjing Massacre and was a member of a committee assembled by Kaikosha to study the incident.

He graduated from the faculty of engineering at Yokohama National University and was manager of Itakura factories.

In addition to his business, he wrote and spoke on military history, the Japanese history textbook controversies, the comfort women, and especially the Nanjing Massacre. He estimated that 10,000 to 20,000 Chinese were massacred in Nanjing and consistently criticized advocates of the great massacre school such as those who accepted the line of the Chinese government that 300,000 had been murdered.

Itakura was on good terms with the historian Ikuhiko Hata while still publicly arguing with him. He was also a friend of Masaaki Tanaka though he had exposed his fraudulent tampering of the diary of Iwane Matsui.

Itakura died of liver failure in 1999.

== Works ==
- 『本当はこうだった南京事件』（日本図書刊行会）
- 『間違いだらけの新聞報道』（共著 閣文社）
- 『南京事件の真実』ブックレット（日本政策研究センター）
- 「松井石根大将『陣中日記』改竄の怪」（『歴史と人物』昭和60年冬号）
- 「南京事件の数量的研究」（『軍事史学』平成2年通巻101号）
- 「南京事件-虐殺の責任論」（軍事史学会編『日中戦争の諸相』平成9年）
- 「「ラーベ日記の徹底検証」を批判する」（『正論』平成10年6月号）
