= Shokun! =

Japanese conservative monthly magazine by Bungeishunju Ltd

- Frequency: Monthly
- First issue: May 1969
- Final issue: May 2009
- Company: Bungeishunju
- Country: Japan
- Based in: Tokyo
- Language: Japanese
- Website: Shokun!

Shokun! (諸君!, Shokun!, literally "Gentlemen!") was a monthly magazine of conservative opinion published by Bungeishunju Ltd. It normally went on sale on the first day of each month though at the end of the year it was released on the 25th or 26th and in the past it had been released on the second or third day. The chief editor of the final issue was Hiroto Uchida who headed an editorial staff consisting of a small group of only five to seven highly active editors. The number of copies circulated was about 60,000 in September 2008 but actual sales were about 40,000 copies. The magazine ceased publication with the June 2009 issue.

== Founding of Shokun ==
At the time disturbances by radical groups on university campuses were intensifying and the president of the Bungeishunju corporation Shinpei Ikejima was coming to the conclusion that perhaps the media also were too solidly left-wing. Therefore, he tried to create a magazine that would be able to carry conservative articles "proudly befitting the Japanese people" which were hard to deal with in the company's star publication of Bungeishunju. Regarding the launch of Shokun, Ikejima stated that "Bungeishunju was no longer a magazine in which I was able to say the things I wanted to say and we were able to sell more than enough of it, so I sought to create a magazine, even if it was much smaller circulation, in which I would say what I wanted to say."

The first issue was printed in May but published as the July issue. The first chief editor, later President and chairman, was Kengo Tanaka. It was considered as an offshoot of Bungeishunju and was also called the "Editorial Bunshun". The contents of Shokun came to adhere to and strongly reflect the intentions of the Chief Editor Tanaka. It was a conservative and right-wing literary magazine like Seiron, Voice, and WiLL, and was a counterpart to magazines such as Ronza owned by the Asahi Shimbun Company, which ceased publication in 2008, and Sekai owned by the liberal and left-wing-aligned Iwanami Shoten.

== Influence in literary circles ==
In the magazine's early days among the conservative literary critics who contributed articles were Tsuneari Fukuda, Kobayashi Hideo, Michio Takeyama, Shichihei Yamamoto, Jun Eto, Kentaro Hayashi, Michitaro Tanaka, Masataka Kosaka, and Takeshi Muramatsu.

At their own request Ikejima said that he had plans to publish Shokun as the bulletin of the Japanese Cultural Conference, a conservative group formed the year before centering on Yukio Mishima and Tsuneari Fukuda who shared Ikejima's sense of crisis about Japan's future, However, he settled on the magazine's current form due to strong opposition within his company, though the Japanese Cultural Conference continued to operate until the spring of 1994.

Immediately before his suicide Mishima dictated the essay Kakumei no Tetsugaku Toshite no Yōmeigaku ("Yangmingism as a philosophy of revolution") in the presence of Chief Editor Tanaka, which became his only essay in the publication and can now be read in the anthology Kōdōgaku Nyūmon ("An Introduction to Action Philosophy"). The entire February 1971 issue of Shokun is a special issue about the death of Yukio Mishima.

In 1980 Ikutarō Shimizu, who was left-wing until the start of the 1960s, cemented Shokun's status as a core monthly magazine of conservative literati through articles on his widely talked about ideological conversion and his advocating that Japan acquire nuclear weapons. What's more, Shimizu serialized his memoirs, Waga Jinsei no Danpen ("Fragments of my Life"), in Shokun which he then published in two volumes.

== Serialized columns ==
Starting at the magazine's inception with the article Jidai to Watashi ("The Times and I") by Michitaro Tanaka, Shokun serialized the memoirs of famous scholars including Tsuneichi Miyamoto and Mitsusada Inoue.

In addition, throughout the 1980s the writer Jun Henmi serialized her face-to-face interviews with then-active scholars and men of letters born in the Meiji Period including Kinji Imanishi, Tetsuzo Tanikawa, and Bunmei Tsuchiya. Afterwards these were published as the book Hajimete Kataru Koto ("Things I Will Say For The First Time").

Starting with the January 1980 issue the opening column was Shinshi to Shukujo ("Ladies and Gentlemen") the author of which was revealed in the final issue to be Takao Tokuoka. The ending column Waranudemonashi ("Not Without Laughter") by Natsuhiko Yamamoto was also famous. Yamamoto wrote it about 350 times up until shortly before his death in 2002.

Shokun also dealt with science-related projects in columns by, initially, Takashi Tachibana, and later by authors like Fujio Nakano.

Shokun criticized heavily the Shinpoteki Bunkajin, the mostly left-wing so-called "progressive intellectuals" who published many books with Iwanami Shoten and wrote essays for the magazine Sekai. Particularly after the dissolution of the Soviet Union there was the widely discussed serial column Akumabarai no Sengoshi ("A post-war history of demon exorcism") written by Takeshi Inagaki. Each column was introduced with the name of the intellectual and appropriate citations followed by a wide variety of his past statements unconditionally praising the personality cult of Kim Il Sung or the Chinese Cultural Revolution or the dictatorship of the Soviet Union, which were exhumed by Inagaki from old magazines and newspaper articles. Inagaki won the Yamamoto Shichihei Award for his work.

== Other editorial stances and policies ==
Sôka Gakkai

Shokun was critical of New Komeito political party and Soka Gakkai Buddhist organization, just like its sister publications Bungeishunju and Shukan Bunshun.

In addition to the lead column Shinshi to Shukujo, which frequently brought to attention the words and deeds of Soka Gakkai President Daisaku Ikeda, the part of the magazine which took the harshest stance towards the organization was a series of editorials entitled Gekkan Soka Gakkai Mondai ("This Month's Soka Gakkai Problem") where writer Kunio Naito (former member of the Mainichi Shimbun editorial team) denounced what he considered an excessive glorification of Ikeda.

Shokun! regularly attacked the close relationship between the Soka Gakkai and the Komeito, criticinzing the religious influence over the political sphere.

Nationalism

Shokun published essays directly confronting issues relating to wartime and pre-war Japan and warning of rising nationalism in neighbouring countries such as China, South Korea, and North Korea. Shokun's editorial line had adamantly advocated worship at Yasukuni Shrine but after the 2006 discovery of the memo of Tomohiko Tomita they put together a special issue softening their hardline stance.

In the 1990s the pages of Shokun became the principal base for development of Nobukatsu Fujioka's "liberal view of history" and together with their main rival magazine Seiron it was deeply involved with the Japanese Society for History Textbook Reform formed in 1996, though Seiron was even more proactively connected with the Society.

Asahi Shimbun

Above all, since the first issue, criticism of the Asahi Shimbun was something akin to the magazine's lifework and it put together many special issues staking out a firmly critical stance against the newspaper. When left-wing media outlets like Asahi remained silent on the issue of abductions by North Korea Shokun was right from the start covering the issue heavily. Into the 21st century, Shokun made sweeping criticism of Asahi Shimbun's 2005 attack on NHK for allegedly censoring parts of the proceedings of the Women's International War Crimes Tribunal on Japan's Military Sexual Slavery and like Shinzo Abe accused the newspaper of fabrication.

Shokun was also critical of Asahi Shimbun journalist Katsuichi Honda. Especially well-known was the debate in the pages of the magazine between Honda and Japanese Jew Isaiah Ben-Dasan, which was actually the secret alter ego of Shichihei Yamamoto, who was the famous author of the bestselling Nihonjin to Yudayajin ("The Japanese and the Jews") and who strongly objected to the factual validity of Honda's description of the Nanjing Massacre in his column series entitled Chūgoku no Tabi ("Travels in China"). The fact that Shokun carried Honda's responses, which they decided would take the form of multiple back-and-forth correspondence, is said to have greatly contributed to the growth of the magazine's circulation. Though Honda had always doubted Ben-Dasan's existence, Shichihei Yamamoto, who translated Ben-Dasan's articles and claimed to be his "representative", never admitted the truth. The full text of the debate is recorded in Honda's book Korosu Gawa no Ronri ("The Logic of the Killers").

When Shinzo Abe was prime minister, Shokun ran many special editions about his "Beautiful Country" book and his policies under that slogan featuring contributions by right-wing advocates, but following the LDP's sound drubbing in the upper house elections of 2007 Shokun replaced their chief editor shortly before Abe resigned as prime minister and sought to change their editorial positions.

Though there were also times in the past that Shokun let people not affiliated with the conservative camp contribute articles including Yoshiaki Kobayashi, Akira Asada, Jiro Yamaguchi, Eiji Otsuka, and Masaru Kaneko, in the magazine's final years non-right-wing controversialists such as Chizuko Ueno, Yasuaki Onuma, Shinichiro Inaba, and Shoichi Inoue made appearances in varied formats including interviews and editorials. On this point they were different from Seiron which only ran conservative authors. Also, Shokun sometimes made special issues where they listened to the opinions of intellectuals in all walks of life in the form of a questionnaire and on these occasions the honour of appearing was broad from the left-wing to those with little in the way of political affiliation. In the February 2001 issue they published the results of a diverse questionnaire for participants in the debate on the Nanjing Massacre, and organized and printed a roundtable discussion moderated by then Sankei Shimbun editorial writer Mizuho Ishikawa between Kenichi Matsumoto, Ikuhiko Hata, and Shudo Higashinakano who represented the so-called "three schools of thought" on the massacre.

== Criticism ==
In 2005 special editions were made with such titles as "When the Asahi Shimbun is after you" and "When China is after you", but these seemingly provocative titles are a so-called Shokun tradition.

In 2006 the journalist Takao Saito slammed Shokun by saying that in the past the magazine's characteristic was "anything goes except speaking ill about the Emperor", and also by likening the current magazine to a "monthly 2channel", in that the political positions of the magazine were of the same stock as the forum posts that were made daily on 2channel under the headings of Anti-Tokutei Asia, Anti-Liberalism, and Reviving Conservatism, plus the very way Shokun kept on putting together monthly special editions was similar to the style of 2channel. In the August 2006 issue of Shokun social philosopher and former Unification Church member Masaki Nakamasa hit back at Saito in the article Sayoku no Saigo no Toride: Kakusa Shakai Aikokushin Kyobozai Hantai ("The Last Bastions of the Left-Wing: Opposition to the Rich-Poor Divide, Patriotism, and the Proposed Anti-Conspiracy Bill"), but Saito said that he was dismayed at the response by Shokun's editors limiting him to the readers' section when he requested that they let him rebut Nakamasa in at least two pages. It was in the past a tradition of Shokun that they devote two pages to publishing rebuttals by people of the press to any critical article over several pages, and even Kotaro Tawara, a critic who worked for the Sankei Shimbun, was given the opportunity to rebut in two pages in the March 2004 issue criticism by columnist Hideo Ishii. In the end, Saito did not make a rebuttal.

== Demise of the magazine and after ==
The magazine Seiron, affiliated with Sankei Shimbun, was considered a second tier conservative magazine, but due to an increase in their readership, as of the latter half of the 1990s Seiron and Shokun were ranked equally on sales pages. The two magazines ended up dividing readers who wanted the leading conservative monthly magazine.

Shokun's annual average circulation was a little over 80,000 copies up to August 2005 and hit a peak at 85,000 copies in 2006, but then fell to about 65,000 copies by September 2008. Actual sales were reportedly less than 40,000. In March 2009 it was announced that Shokun would cease publication with the June 2009 issue which would go on sale on 1 May 2009, the magazine's 40th anniversary. There was also a drop in advertising revenue in the whole Bungeishunju corporation and putting an end to Shokun became part of a complete overhaul of the company's business. In the last issue Shokun, like another defunct magazine Hatsugensha, put out advertisements recommending Seiron magazine. Currently, there are no plans for publication of a successor magazine.

On 31 January 2012 after an absence of about three years Shokun was revived for a single special issue about North Korea in the format of a supplementary edition of the February 2012 issue of the magazine Bungeishunju.

== See also ==
- Historiography of the Nanking Massacre
- Japanese history textbook controversies
- Controversies surrounding Yasukuni Shrine
