= Nanjing Massacre denial =

Denial of the 1937 massacre by Japan

Denial of the Nanjing Massacre is a negationist claim asserting that the murder and rape of hundreds of thousands of Chinese soldiers and civilians by Imperial Japanese forces in Nanjing is a fabrication or exaggeration. Most historians accept the findings of the Tokyo tribunal with respect to the scope and nature of the atrocities which were committed by the Imperial Japanese Army after the Battle of Nanjing during the Second Sino-Japanese War. In Japan, however, there has been a debate over the extent and nature of the massacre, with some historians attempting to downplay or outright deny that the massacre took place.

Experts hold differing estimations for the total death count. Some think it could be as low as 40,000, but most historians think it was somewhere between 50,000 and 300,000. The International Military Tribunal for the Far East has said there were at least 200,000 deaths. Some scholars, notably negationists in Japan, have contended that the actual death toll is far lower, or even that the event was entirely fabricated and never occurred at all. These negationist accounts of the killings have become a staple of Japanese nationalist discourse. The massacre is also only briefly mentioned in some Japanese school textbooks. Scholars have also said that the Japanese version of the Wikipedia article (南京事件) emphasizes negationist narratives.

Some Japanese journalists and social scientists, such as Tomio Hora and Katsuichi Honda, have played prominent roles in countering Nanjing Massacre denialism in the decades after the killings. Nonetheless, denialist accounts, such as those of Shūdō Higashinakano, have often created controversy in the global media, particularly in China and other East Asian nations.

China–Japan relations are affected negatively by denial of the massacre, as it is seen in China as part of an overall unwillingness on Japan's part to admit and apologize for its aggression, or a perceived insensitivity regarding the killings.

The international academic community generally agree the Nanjing massacre happened and concur on the wide scale of the event. The basic facts have an overwhelming consensus among historians. Although there are still some arguments over the details of the event, such as the exact number of victims, most historians still recognize the scale and nature of the massacre after post-war investigations. These conclusions are supported by a large number of testimonies and archives. As a result, denialists and revisionists who deny or downplay the nature and scale of Nanjing massacre are usually not considered to be mainstream in academic research.

== National identity ==
Takashi Yoshida asserts that, "Nanjing has figured in the attempts of all three nations [China, Japan and the United States] to preserve and redefine national and ethnic pride and identity, assuming different kinds of significance based on each country's changing internal and external enemies."

=== Japan ===
In Japan, interpretation of the Nanjing Massacre is a reflection upon the Japanese national identity and notions of "pride, honor and shame". Takashi Yoshida describes the Japanese debate over the Nanjing Massacre as "crystalliz[ing] a much larger conflict over what should constitute the ideal perception of the nation: Japan, as a nation, acknowledges its past and apologizes for its wartime wrongdoings; or ... stands firm against foreign pressures and teaches Japanese youth about the benevolent and courageous martyrs who fought a just war to save Asia from Western aggression." In some nationalist circles in Japan, speaking of a large-scale massacre at Nanjing is regarded as "'Japan bashing' (in the case of foreigners) or 'self-flagellation' (in the case of Japanese)".

The academic community is increasingly paying more attention on the role that digital medias such as Japanese Wikipedia play in shaping the public consensus of Nanjing Massacre. The researchers found that the online content are showing the tread of historical revisionism more frequently. They narrated the event selectively and using a controversial view to interpret the historical resources. Meanwhile scholars and editors are actively countering such revisionist narratives by emphasizing the evidence norms and historical writing standards base on primary sources. Askew(2007) emphasizes that in the investigations of Nanjing massacre, it is crucial to conduct a critical assessment of the testimonies and other evidence that can be regarded as primary sources. He also warns against the interpretations which mainly driven by political agendas instead of rigor analysis of the content. This assertion is aligning with boarder efforts created by historians and editors which resists historical denial and distortion. A recent research that operated by Wikimedia foundation (2022-2024)indicated that Wikimedia among different versions of languages are continuously correcting the content that have a tendency towards historical revisionism through moderation and editing practices.

=== China ===
David Askew, an associate professor of law at Ritsumeikan Asia Pacific University, characterizes the Nanjing Massacre as having "emerged as a fundamental keystone in the construction of the modern Chinese national identity". According to Askew, "a refusal to accept the 'orthodox' position on Nanjing can be construed as an attempt to deny the Chinese nation a legitimate voice in international society".

=== Taiwan (Republic of China) ===
Former Taiwanese President Lee Teng-hui had, on numerous occasions, claimed that the Nanjing Massacre was purely propaganda perpetrated by the Chinese communists and which could be placed into the same category as "fictitious history"; a position which has stirred controversy in both mainland China and Taiwan. However, Lee's comments are generally regarded as his personal political interpretation instead of general consensus of mainstream Taiwanese historical community. In Taiwan, Nanjing massacre is widely recognized as a historical event of the Second Sino-Japanese War, even though the interpretations of its political significance can be different among different political parties. Taiwan's historical research on wartime memory are generally tending to adopt a transitional narrative perspective instead of historical denial. The majority of Taiwan scholars resist revisionism. Therefore, in academic literature, Lee's opinions are usually viewed as politically controversial rather than representative positions of Taiwan as a whole. Lee had spent the first 22 years of life in Taiwan under Japanese rule, serving as a military officer when the island-nation was still under Japanese rule. In general, attitudes in Taiwan towards Japan are more positive than in the PRC due to the longer and less harsh Japanese administration of Taiwan compared to the Japanese occupation in the PRC. Furthermore, the geopolitical alignment of Taiwan and Japan against the PRC mean that the perception of Japan is less influenced by Japanese actions in WWII and more influenced by contemporary Japanese cultural exports.

The rest of the world, outside of China and Japan, has largely dismissed attempts to downplay the Nanjing Massacre. Most historians in the US and Europe agree with the findings of the International Military Tribunal for the Far East. Historian Daqing Yang notes a growing consensus among experts that Japanese soldiers were responsible for large-scale atrocities in Nanjing, and that the mass killings of Chinese prisoners of war were ordered, not random. Western scholars place the Nanjing Massacre into the context of Japan's other wartime atrocities, comparing those who deny it to others who distort history. Refusing to acknowledge the massacre hurts China–Japan relations, as it is seen as part of Japan's reluctance to admit to its past mistakes in Asia. This issue remains a major point of tension between the two countries, with many in China feeling that Japan has not done enough to make amends for its actions during the war.

== Issues of definition ==
The precise definition of the geographical area involved, duration of the massacre, as well as who is to be considered and counted among the victims, forms a major part of both the definition of the massacre and the arguments of denialists. Among the most extreme denialists, casualty claims range from several dozen to several hundred. Masaaki Tanaka, a denialist, engaged in academic misconduct to support his claim that the massacre was a fabrication and death tolls were low. However, figures within the range of 50,000–300,000 are typically articulated among more sophisticated and mainstream historians. The International Military Tribunal for the Far East estimated at least 200,000 casualties and at least 20,000 cases of rape.

The common revisionist viewpoint, made by denialists such as Higashinakano Shudo, is that the geographical area of the incident should be limited to the few square kilometers of the city, and they typically estimate the population to be about 200,000–250,000. However, this geographic definition is almost universally unheard of outside of revisionist circles. Their use of 200,000–250,000 civilians also only includes those in the Nanjing Safety Zone, which does not include everyone inside of the city.

Most historians include a much larger area around the city, including the Xiaguan district (the suburbs north of Nanjing city, about 31 km^{2} in size) and other areas on the outskirts of the city. In 2003, Zhang Lianhong estimated that the population of greater Nanjing was between 535,000 and 635,000 civilians and soldiers just prior to the Japanese occupation. In 2008, he revised his estimate to 468,000–568,000. Some historians also include six counties around Nanjing, known as the Nanjing Special Municipality. With the six surrounding counties included, the population of Nanjing is estimated to be more than 1 million.

The duration of the incident is naturally defined by its geography: the earlier the Japanese entered the area, the longer the duration. The Battle of Nanjing ended on December 13, when the divisions of the Japanese Army entered the walled city of Nanjing. The International Military Tribunal for the Far East (IMTFE) defined the duration of the massacre as the six weeks following the fall of Nanjing on December 13, 1937." More conservative estimates say the massacre started on December 14, when the troops entered the Safety Zone, and that it lasted for six weeks.

Most scholars have accepted figures between 50,000 and 300,000 dead as an approximate total. Negationists in Japan, however, have contended at times that the actual death toll is far lower, or even that the event was entirely fabricated and never occurred at all.

The argument about how far the damage spread and how long it lasted is not about academics, it is a key tactic used by people who deny what really happened to downplay the number of victims. By narrowing down the area and time frame to the smallest possible, these deniers can claim that the documented atrocities do not meet the standard definition of a "massacre". As historian David Askew pointed out, there is no clear agreement on what kind of death counts as part of a massacre, or how many deaths it takes to qualify, and deniers take advantage of this uncertainty. Most historians from around the world use a broader definition that includes not just the city itself, but also the surrounding areas and counties, which leads to estimates of between 100,000 and over 300,000 victims. This is a big difference, and it is not just about numbers, it is about understanding how terrible the atrocity was.

According to part of the official stance of the Japanese Ministry of Foreign Affairs:

The Government of Japan believes that it cannot be denied that following the entrance of the Japanese Army into Nanjing in 1937, the killing of noncombatants, looting and other acts occurred. However, there are numerous theories as to the actual number of victims, and the Government of Japan believes it is difficult to determine which the correct number is.

This interpretation of events questions the true number of victims killed in Nanjing and avoids directly stating the culpability of Japanese soldiers for the atrocities. The remainder of the Ministry's stance reiterates the lengths to which Japan has so far apologized for the war actions, including in statements from several prime ministers. However, the Ministry's definition of the Nanjing Massacre remains vague and open to more revisionist interpretations.

== History and censorship during the war ==
During the war, Japanese media and newspapers typically portrayed a positive view of the war in China. Reports on the massacre were generally muted, and newspaper reports and photos typically emphasized cooperation between Chinese civilians and Japanese soldiers. Massacre denialists claim that the news published in the Japanese media and newspapers were "true" and "reliable" stories. However, most mainstream historians counter that it is well known that the Naikaku Jōhōkyoku (Cabinet Information Bureau), a consortium of military, politicians and professionals created in 1936 as a "committee" and upgraded to a "division" in 1937, applied censorship of all the media of the Shōwa regime and that this office held a policing authority over the realm of publishing. Therefore, the Naikaku Jōhōkyoku's activities were proscriptive as well as prescriptive. Besides issuing detailed guidelines to publishers, it made suggestions that were all but commands. From 1938, the print media "would come to realize that their survival depended upon taking cues from the Cabinet Information Bureau and its flagship publication, Shashin shūhō, designers of the 'look' of the soldier, and the 'look' of the war".

Article 12 of the censorship guideline for newspapers issued in September 1937 stated that any news article or photograph "unfavorable" to the Imperial Army was subject to a gag. Article 14 prohibited any "photographs of atrocities" but endorsed reports about the "cruelty of the Chinese" soldiers and civilians.

Owing to the censorship, none of the hundred Japanese reporters in Nanjing when the city was captured wrote anything unfavorable to their countrymen. In 1956, however, Masatake Imai, correspondent for the Tokyo Asahi Shimbun who reported only about the "majestic and soul-stirring ceremony" of the triumphal entry of the Imperial Army, revealed he witnessed a mass execution of 400 to 500 Chinese men near Tokyo Asahi's office. "I wish I could write about it", he told his colleague Nakamura. "Someday, we will, but not for the time being. But we sure saw it", Nakamura answered.

Shigeharu Matsumoto, the Shanghai bureau chief of Dōmei Tsushin, wrote that the Japanese reporters he interviewed all told him they saw between 2,000 and 3,000 corpses around the Xiaguan area and a reporter, Yuji Maeda, saw recruits executing Chinese prisoners of war with bayonets.

Jiro Suzuki, a correspondent for the Tokyo Nichi Nichi Shimbun, wrote, "When I went back to the Zhongshan Gate, I saw for the first time an unearthly, brutal massacre. On the top of the wall, about 25 meters high, the prisoners of war were rounded up in a line. They were being stabbed by bayonets and shoved away off the wall. A number of Japanese soldiers polished their bayonets, shouted to themselves once and thrust their bayonets in the chest or back of POWs."

Historian Tokushi Kasahara notes, "Some deniers argue that Nanjing was much more peaceful than we generally think. They always show some photographs with Nanjing refugees selling some food in the streets or Chinese people smiling in the camps. They are forgetting about Japanese propaganda. The Imperial Army imposed strict censorship. Any photographs with dead bodies couldn't get through. So photographers had to remove all the bodies before taking pictures of streets and buildings in the city ... Even if the photos were not staged, the refugees had no choice but to fawn on the Japanese soldiers. Acting otherwise meant their deaths".

=== Revived international interest in the Nanjing Massacre ===
Iris Chang's 1997 book, The Rape of Nanking, renewed global interest in the Nanjing Massacre. The book sold more than half a million copies when it was first published in the US, and according to The New York Times, received general critical acclaim. The Wall Street Journal wrote that it was the "first comprehensive examination of the destruction of this Chinese imperial city", and that Chang "skillfully excavated from oblivion the terrible events that took place". The Philadelphia Inquirer wrote that it was a "compelling account of a horrendous episode that, until recently, has been largely forgotten". The text, however, was not without controversy. Chang's account drew on new sources to break new ground in the study of the period. Japanese ultranationalists maintained that the Nanjing Massacre was a fabrication which sought "to demonize the Japanese race, culture, history, and nation".

=== Massacre affirmation vs. massacre denial ===
Takashi Hoshiyama characterizes opinion in Japan about the Nanjing Massacre as "broadly divided into two schools of thought: the massacre affirmation school, which asserts that a large-scale massacre took place, and the massacre denial school, which asserts that, a certain number of isolated aberrations aside, no massacre took place".

In the massacre affirmation school, both Ikuhiko Hata and Tokushi Kasahara are representative academic leaders of this school. The books the two wrote were published and widely read, based on reliable researches. However, even in the school over 300,000 casualties are decided to be too large, considering the population and the scale of the military and this is against the formal released number of China. In Japan, the comments in the webpage of Ministry of Foreign Affairs of Japan and the description of Japanese textbooks are consistent with the academic theories of the school.

=== Hijacking of the debate by layperson activists ===
David Askew asserts that the debate over the Nanjing Massacre has been hijacked by "two large groups of layperson activists".

"Chinese" are turned into a single, homogenised voice and portrayed as sinister and manipulative twisters of the truth, while the similarly homogenized "Japanese" are portrayed as uniquely evil, as cruel and blood-thirsty beyond redemption, and as deniers of widely accepted historical truths.

Both positions are victimisation narratives. One depicts the Chinese as helpless victims of brutal Japanese imperialism in the winter of 1937–38, while the other depicts the gullible Japanese, innocent in the ways of the world, as victims of Chinese machinations and propaganda in the post-war era.

=== Japanese perspectives on the massacre ===
Japanese affirmationists not only accept the validity of these tribunals and their findings, but also assert that Japan must stop denying the past and come to terms with Japan's responsibility for the war of aggression against its Asian neighbors. Affirmationists have drawn the attention of the Japanese public to atrocities committed by the Japanese Army during World War II in general and the Nanjing Massacre in particular in support of an anti-war agenda.

The most extreme denialists, by and large, reject the findings of the tribunals as a kind of "victor's justice" in which only the winning side's version of events are accepted. Described within Japan as the Illusion School (maboroshi-ha), they deny the massacre and argue that only a few POWs and civilians were killed by the Japanese military in Nanjing. More moderate denialists argue that between several thousand and 38,000–42,000 were massacred.

== Prominent Japanese denialists ==
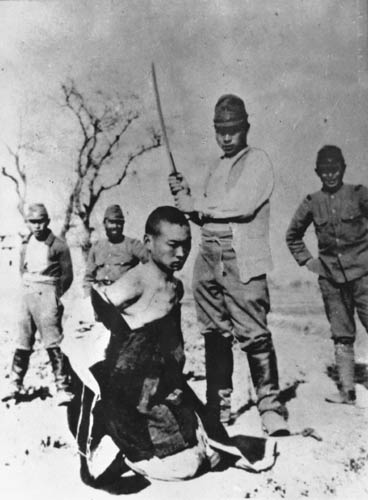
A Chinese POW about to be beheaded by a Japanese officer with a shin guntō during the Nanjing Massacre

=== Shūdō Higashinakano ===
Massacre denialists such as Shūdō Higashinakano argue that the Nanjing Massacre was a fabrication and war-time propaganda spread by the Chinese Nationalists and Communists. He argues that the activities of the Japanese military in Nanjing were in accordance with international law and were humane. Among other claims, he has denied that there was execution of POWs in uniform, and cited anecdotes claiming that Chinese POWs were treated humanely by Japanese soldiers. However, Higashinakano has also claimed at times that the executed POWs were illegitimate combatants, and so their execution was legitimate under international law. Higashinakano believes some several thousand "illegitimate combatants" may have been executed in such a fashion.

What Higashinakano believed is against the articles of Hague Conventions of 1899 and 1907, which was ratified by Japan and China. Japan violated the spirit and the letter of the laws of war. For example, according to historian Akira Fujiwara, on August 6, 1937, deputy minister of Military of Japan notified Japanese troops in Shanghai of the army's proposition to remove the constraints of international law on the treatment of Chinese prisoners. This directive also advised staff officers to stop using the term "prisoner of war". During the massacre, Japanese troops in fact embarked on a determined search for former soldiers, in which thousands of young men were captured, most of whom were killed. In another case, Japanese troops gathered 1,300 Chinese soldiers and civilians at the Taiping Gate and killed them. The victims were blown up with landmines, then doused with petrol before being set on fire. Those that were left alive afterward were killed with bayonets. F. Tillman Durdin and Archibald Steele, American news correspondents, reported that they had seen bodies of killed Chinese soldiers forming mounds six feet high at Nanjing's Yijiang Gate in the north. Durdin, who was working for the New York Times, made a tour of Nanjing before his departure from the city. He heard waves of machine-gun fire and witnessed the Japanese soldiers gun down some two hundred Chinese within ten minutes. Two days later, in his report to the New York Times, he stated that the alleys and street were filled with civilian bodies, including women and children.

A claim that Harold Timperley, whose report formed the basis of the Tribunal's findings, was reporting only hearsay, and that thus, the figure of 300,000 dead was "unreal", drew a response from Bob Tadashi Wakabayashi, who suggested that Higashinakano's assertions and conclusion were not "sensible":

Higashinakano jumps to this conclusion in all earnestness because he clings to a hypothetical fixation that the Atrocity never happened. This forces him to seize any shred of evidence, whether sound or not, to sustain and systematize that delusion.

Higashinakano has also at times denied the occurrence of mass rape on the part of Japanese troops, at times ascribing it to Chinese soldiers, and at other times simply denying its occurrence. The occurrence of rape during the massacre is testified to by John Rabe, elected leader of the Nanjing Safety Zone, who writes:

Two Japanese soldiers have climbed over the garden wall and are about to break into our house. When I appear they give the excuse that they saw two Chinese soldiers climb over the wall. When I show them my party badge, they return the same way. In one of the houses in the narrow street behind my garden wall, a woman was raped, and then wounded in the neck with a bayonet. I managed to get an ambulance so we can take her to Kulou Hospital. ... Last night up to 1,000 women and girls are said to have been raped, about 100 girls at Ginling Girls College alone. You hear nothing but rape. If husbands or brothers intervene, they're shot. What you hear and see on all sides is the brutality and bestiality of the Japanese soldiers.

Minnie Vautrin, a professor at Ginling College, wrote in her diary on that day, "Oh God, control the cruel beastliness of the Japanese soldiers in Nanking tonight", and on the 19th, "In my wrath, I wished I had the power to smite them for their dastardly work. How ashamed women of Japan would be if they knew these tales of horror."

Vautrin also wrote in her diary that she had to go to the Japanese embassy repeatedly from December 18 to January 13 to get proclamations to prohibit Japanese soldiers from committing crimes at Ginling because the soldiers tore the documents up before taking women away.

Xia Shuqin, a woman testifying that she had been a massacre victim, sued Higashinakano for defamation for a claim made in a book written in 1998 that the murder of her family had been performed by Chinese, rather than Japanese, soldiers. On 5 February 2009, the Japanese Supreme Court ordered Higashinakano and the publisher, Tendensha, to pay 4 million yen in damages to Xia. According to the court, Higashinakano failed to prove that she and the girl were different persons, and that she was not a witness of the Nanjing Massacre, as Higashinakano had claimed in his book.

=== Masaaki Tanaka ===
Masaaki Tanaka was discredited after it was proven that he engaged in academic misconduct by altering several hundred places of an important document.

In his book The Fabrication of the 'Nanjing Massacre', Masaaki Tanaka alleges that there was no indiscriminate killing in Nanjing and that the massacre was a fabrication manufactured by the International Military Tribunal for the Far East (IMTFE) and the Chinese government for the purpose of propaganda. He alleged that the Tokyo Tribunal was "victor's justice" and not a fair trial; that there were 2000 deaths for the entirety of the massacre; and that many civilians were killed by the Chinese military.

== Japanese Wikipedia ==
The Japanese Wikipedia, the fourth largest Wikipedia edition, has been criticized for promoting negationist or revisionist narratives about the Nanjing Massacre. Scholars have compared and contrasted the article on the massacre (as well as other World War II–era topics) across various languages. In a 2018 book, Florian Schneider of Leiden University noted that a 2015 version of the Japanese article attempted to imply that the rape and murder of Chinese civilians had occurred in the context of apprehending Chinese defectors. Schneider also noted that there were few to no images on the article; instead it contained a single image of Japanese soldiers checking Chinese prisoners for weapons. In a 2019 paper, Karl Gustafsson of Stockholm University noted that the first paragraph of the Japanese article expressed doubt about the details of the incident and "thereby portrays the Japanese military less negatively". In a 2021 article published in Slate magazine, Yumiko Sato similarly reported that the article read, "The Chinese side calls it the Nanjing Massacre, but the truth of the incident is still unknown", and identified a lack of pictures on the article. The Japanese Wikipedia editor and academic Sae Kitamura agreed that revisionism was an issue, but corrected some technical aspects of Sato's arguments.

== See also ==
- 2005 anti-Japanese demonstrations
- Anti-Chinese sentiment in Japan
- Racism in Japan
- Sino-Japanese relations
- Japanese history textbook controversies
- List of war apology statements issued by Japan
- Japanese Society for History Textbook Reform
- Japanese nationalism
- Historiography of the Nanjing Massacre
- Shintaro Ishihara
- Keisuke Honda
- Nippon Kaigi
- Japanese war crimes
- Statism in Shōwa Japan
- Genocide denial
- Holocaust denial
- Holocaust trivialization
- Armenian genocide denial
- Denial of the genocide of Serbs in the Independent State of Croatia
- Bosnian genocide denial
- Historical negationism

== Bibliography ==
=== Academic sources ===
- Wakabayashi, Bob Tadashi, ed. (2008). The Nanking Atrocity 1937–38: Complicating the Picture.
- Yang, Daqing (June 1999). "Convergence or Divergence? Recent Historical Writings on the Rape of Nanjing". American Historical Review. 104 (3): 842–65. doi:10.2307/2650991. JSTOR 2650991. PMID 19291890.
- Joshua A. Fogel (5 March 2000). The Nanjing Massacre in History and Historiography. University of California Press. ISBN 0-520-22007-2.
- Kasahara Tokushi (1998). Nankin jiken Iwanami shinsho. 青木書店. ISBN 4-250-98016-2.
- Yoshida Yutaka. Nankin jiken o dou miruka.
- Yoshida Yutaka (1998). Tenno no Guntai to Nankin Jiken. 青木書店. ISBN 4-250-98019-7.
- Askew, David (April 2002). "The Nanjing Incident – Recent Research and Trends". Electronic Journal of Contemporary Japanese Studies.
- Fujiwara Akira. Nitchû Sensô ni Okeru Horyotoshido Gyakusatsu.
- Yoshida, Takashi (2006). The Making of the "Rape of Nanking.

=== Denialist sources ===
- Hata, Ikuhiko (1986). Nanjing Incident (Nankin Jiken Gyakusatsu no kozo 南京事件―「虐殺」の構造). Chuo Koron Shinsho. ISBN 4-12-100795-6.
- Higashinakano, Syudo (2003). The Truth of the Nanking Operation in 1937 (1937 Nanking Koryakusen no Shinjitsu). Shogakukan.
- Tanaka, Masaaki (1984). Fabrication of Nanjing Massacre. Nihon Kyobun Sha.
