= Historiography of the Nanjing Massacre =

The Historiography of the Nanjing Massacre examines how the 1937–1938 massacre of Chinese by the Imperial Japanese Army in Nanjing has been documented, interpreted, and debated over time. Scholarly interpretations vary regarding the scale of the atrocities, the responsibility of Japanese authorities, and the ways in which the massacre has been remembered or downplayed in Japan, China, and internationally outside the two Asian countries. Debates have been shaped by nationalist perspectives, political considerations, access to sources, and evolving historical methods, highlighting how memory, ideology, and evidence influence the understanding of this pivotal event in East Asian history.

While mainly written by non-academic lay authors, revisionist works of the Nanjing Massacre in Japan have been increasingly vocal in the past years, generating international disputes and heightening nationalist tensions. A widely cited figure in historical discussions is that over 200,000 Chinese civilians and prisoners of war were killed during the Nanjing Massacre, according to the International Military Tribunal for the Far East (IMTFE), convened after World War II. Despite numerous attempts at collaboration, Japan and China have yet to reach an agreement on the death toll, and the debate remains a significant factor in regional geopolitical tensions in East Asia.

== Second Sino-Japanese War ==
During the war, the Japanese Government kept tight control over the news media. As a result, the Japanese public was not aware of the Nanjing Massacre or other war crimes committed by the Japanese military. The Japanese military was, rather, portrayed as a heroic entity. Japanese officials lied about civilian death figures at the time of the Nanjing Massacre, and some Japanese ultranationalists still deny that the killings occurred.

One brief lapse in the Japanese government's control over negative depictions of the war was the fleeting public distribution of Tatsuzō Ishikawa's wartime novel, Living Soldier (Ikiteiru heitai), which depicted the grim and dehumanizing effects of the war. Ishikawa and his publisher tried to satisfy government censors by a deliberate decision to self-censor lines about soldiers "forag[ing] for fresh meat" and "search[ing] for women like dogs chasing a rabbit", while still preserving the overall tone and import of the novel. The novel was published in 1938 but was pulled from circulation within days; Ishikawa was sentenced to a four-month prison term for disturbing "peace and order".

Controversy and confusion over the Nanjing massacre occurred even soon after, in 1943 George Orwell wrote in Looking Back on the Spanish War: "Recently I noticed that the very people who swallowed any and every horror story about the Japanese in Nanking in 1937 refused to believe exactly the same stories about Hong Kong in 1942. There was even a tendency to feel that the Nanking atrocities had become, as it were, retrospectively untrue because the British Government now drew attention to them ... There is not the slightest doubt, for instance, about the behaviour of the Japanese in China ... The raping and butchering in Chinese cities, the tortures in the cellars of the Gestapo, the elderly Jewish professors flung into cesspools, the machine-gunning of refugees along the Spanish roads—they all happened, and they did not happen any the less because The Daily Telegraph has suddenly found out about them when it is five years too late."

It was not until the Tokyo Trial (tried by the International Military Tribunal for the Far East) and the Nanjing Trial that the truth of the Nanjing Massacre was first revealed to Japanese civilians. The atrocities revealed during the trials shocked Japanese society at the time.

== Postwar ==
In the 1950s, author Yoshie Hotta wrote a series of pieces of historical fiction about the atrocities in Nanjing.

In 1967, Tomio Hora published his seminal account "Nankin Jiken" ("Nanjing Incident") in which he refuted revisionist denial of the massacre. This detailed treatment of the incident was the first meaningful and in-depth description of the massacre in Japanese postwar historiography. Some leftwing Japanese journalists of the decade were inspired by the American war in Vietnam to research the events.

International interest in the Nanjing Massacre waned into near obscurity until 1972, the year China and Japan normalized diplomatic relations. Discussion of wartime atrocities developed considerably in this period. The Chinese government's statements about the events were attacked by Japanese diplomats, because they relied on personal testimonies and anecdotal evidence. Also coming under attack were the burial records and photographs presented in the Tokyo War Crime Court, which were said to be fabrications by the Chinese government, artificially manipulated or incorrectly attributed to the Nanjing Massacre.

During the 1970s, Japanese journalist Katsuichi Honda traveled to China to explore the wartime conduct of the Imperial Army. Based on his research in China, Honda wrote a series of articles for the Asahi Shimbun on atrocities (such as the Nanjing Massacre) committed by Japanese soldiers during Second Sino-Japanese War, called "Chūgoku no Tabi" (中国の旅, "Travels in China"). The publication of these articles triggered a vehement response from the Japanese right regarding Imperial Japanese war crimes. Japanese nationalist responses answering this publication included the influential articles of Shichihei Yamamoto, "Reply to Katsuichi Honda", and Akira Suzuki, "The Phantom of The Nanjing Massacre".

== Japanese history textbooks ==
In 1965, Japanese-language textbook author Saburō Ienaga sued the Ministry of Education, claiming that the government was unconstitutionally forcing him to alter the contents of his textbook, violating his right to freedom of expression. This case was ultimately decided in the author's favor in 1997.

The way in which the subject is taught in Japanese schools became the center of controversy in the Japanese textbook controversies of 1982 and 1986. The Nanjing Massacre "was still absent from elementary school textbooks [but] junior high school textbooks such as those published by Nihon shoseki and Kyōiku Shuppan in 1975, for instance, mentioned that forty-two thousand Chinese civilians, including women and children, were killed during the Massacre". Two other textbooks mentioned the massacre but the four other textbooks in use in Japan did not mention it all. By 1978 the Ministry of Education removed the number killed out of all text books in use.

In 1982, the Ministry of Education embarked on a campaign to reframe the presentation of the history of World War II in history textbooks. History textbooks were reworded to describe the Sino-Japanese War as "advancing in and out of China" instead of "aggression" which was deemed to be a more pejorative term. The Nanjing Massacre was characterized as a minor incident which was sparked by the frustration of Japanese soldiers at meeting strong resistance from the Chinese Army. These moves sparked strong protests from other Asian countries.

In the 1990s, the stance of the Japanese government began to change as three consecutive prime ministers sought reconciliation with other Asian countries by acknowledging Japan's responsibility for the war.

Immediately after taking office in 1993, Hosokawa Morihiro, prime minister of the first non-Liberal Democratic Party government, characterized Japan's expansion through Asia in the 1930s and 1940s as an "aggressive war". Hosokawa's two successors, Hata Tsutomu and Murayama Tomiichi made similar statements. For example, Murayama Tomiichi expressed "deep remorse" for Japan's colonial rule and aggression.

During this period, officially endorsed school textbooks were rewritten to reflect this changed perspective on Japan's responsibility for the war. For example, of the seven history books approved in 1997 for use in junior high schools, six cited a figure of 200,000 as the number of people killed by the Japanese military during the capture of Nanjing; four of those books also mentioned the higher Chinese estimate of 300,000 casualties.

Besides total denial, another line of Japanese thought insisted that the scale of the Nanjing Massacre had been exaggerated by the Chinese. This view was expounded by Ikuhiko Hata in his book Nanjing Incident. Hata asserted that the number of victims in the Massacre was 38,000–42,000. He argued that only Chinese POWs and civilians, and not Chinese soldiers killed in action on the battlefield, should be counted as victims of the massacre.

== 1980s ==
Chinese interest in the history of the massacre further developed in the 1980s. Research of burial records and documents, as well as interviews, confirmed a figure of 300,000 dead Chinese in the course of the massacre, thus corroborating the findings of the Tokyo War Crimes Tribunal.

In Japan, a variety of new evidence was published, including the private journals of commanding Japanese generals as well as those of many ordinary soldiers. Official military records of a number of the Japanese units involved also became available. In addition, a number of Japanese veterans began openly to admit to having committed or witnessed atrocities in the Nanjing area. Iris Chang mentioned important research was made out of the academic community by freelancers and reporters. She cited the works of Ono Kenji, a chemical factory worker who, from 1988 to 1994, visited 600 households, interviewed 200 persons, photocopied 20 notebooks, and conducted 7 video interviews. Some of his researches were published in Shūkan Kin'yōbi and were saluted as the first work on Nanjing Massacre solely based on Japanese sources. In 1996, he coedited a book on the subject, "living under the constant shadow of possible Japanese retaliation".

Masaaki Tanaka's book "Fabrication of Nanjing Massacre" not only denied the Nanjing Massacre but laid the blame for the Sino-Japanese war on the Chinese Government.

In September 1986, the Japanese education minister, Fujio Masayuki, dismissed the Nanjing massacre as "just a part of war".

The Japanese distributor of The Last Emperor (1987) edited out the stock footage of the Nanjing massacre from the film.

== 1990s ==
As far as Japanese academics are concerned, the controversy over the occurrence of atrocities ended in the early '90s. Both sides accept that atrocities did occur; however, disagreement exists over the actual numbers. The debate is focused on the questions of whether to include archival or anecdotal evidence, what time period to use in defining the massacre, and what geographical area to use in defining the massacre.

=== Chinese historical studies ===
In a 1990 paper entitled The Nanking Massacre and the Nanking Population, Sun Zhai-wei of the Jiangsu Academy of Social Sciences estimated the total number of people killed at 377,400, combining Chinese burial records and estimates totaling 150,000 given by Japanese Imperial Army major Ohta Hisao in a confessional report about the Japanese army's disposal efforts of dead bodies.

=== Denial by Japanese government officials ===
A number of Japanese cabinet ministers, as well as some high-ranking politicians, have made comments denying the atrocities committed by the Japanese Army in World War II. Among these were General Nagano Shigeto, a World War II veteran and a former chief of staff of the Japan Ground Self-Defense Force who was appointed justice minister in spring of 1994. Shigeto told a Japanese newspaper that "the Nanjing Massacre and the rest was a fabrication".

In an interview with Playboy magazine, Tokyo Governor Shintaro Ishihara said, "People say that the Japanese made a holocaust but that is not true. It is a story made up by the Chinese. It has tarnished the image of Japan, but it is a lie." Some subsequently resigned after protests from China and South Korea.

On November 10, 1990, during a protest by Chinese Americans against the Japanese actions on the island of Tiaoyutai, the Deputy Japanese Consul in Houston asserted that "the Nanjing Massacre never occurred".

In response to these and similar incidents, a number of Japanese journalists and historians formed the Nankin Jiken Chōsa Kenkyūkai (Nanjing Incident Research Group). The research group has collected large quantities of archival materials as well as testimonies from both Chinese and Japanese sources.

=== Apology and condolences by the prime minister and emperor of Japan ===
On August 15, 1995, the fiftieth anniversary of the Surrender of Japan, the Japanese prime minister Tomiichi Murayama gave the first clear and formal apology for Japanese actions during the war. He apologized for Japan's wrongful aggression and the great suffering that it inflicted in Asia. He offered his "heartfelt" apology to all survivors and to the relatives and friends of the victims. That day, the prime minister and the Japanese Emperor Akihito pronounced statements of mourning at Tokyo's Nippon Budokan. The emperor offered his condolences and expressed the hope that similar atrocities would never be repeated.

=== Iris Chang ===
Interest in the West remained muted until the publication of Iris Chang's book, The Rape of Nanking, in 1997. Even though her book was criticized by various historians for flaws in accuracy of its historical research, the book raised consciousness of the incident in a much wider Western audience.

== Contemporary debate ==
Currently, no notable group in Japan, even among right-wing nationalists, denies that killings did occur in Nanjing. The debate has shifted mainly to the death toll, to the extent of rapes and civilian killings (as opposed to POW and suspected guerrillas) and to the appropriateness of using the word "massacre". Massacre denialists insist that burial records from the Red Swastika Society and the Chung Shan Tang (Tsung Shan Tong) were never cross examined at the Tokyo and Nanjing trials, arguing therefore that the estimates derived from these two sets of records should be heavily discounted. Although they admit that personal accounts of Japanese soldiers do suggest the occurrence of rapes, they insist that this anecdotal evidence cannot be used to determine the extent of rapes. Moreover, they characterize personal testimonies from the Chinese side to be propaganda. They also point out that, unlike the burial records that document the number of deaths, there are no documented records of the rapes, and so they argue that the allegation of mass rape is unsubstantiated. Massacre denialists also assert that the majority of those killed were POWs and "suspected guerrillas" whose executions they characterize as legitimate, and so they argue the use of the word "massacre" is inappropriate.

Denialist historian Nobukatsu Fujioka has further accused scholars who write about Japan’s wartime atrocities of practicing “jigyaku-shikan,” meaning "masochistic" or "self-deprecating" views of history. Proponents, such as the far-right ultranationalist organisation Nippon Kaigi, argue these approaches to history are "masochistic" approaches to history are anti-Japanese and "leftist", and advocate the teaching of more positive and patriotic historical narratives.

According to Madoka Futamura, since the 1990s, such accusations have been retrospectively applied against the Tokyo Trials.

Within the public the debate still continues. Those downplaying the massacre have most recently rallied around a group of academic and journalists associated with the Tsukurukai. Their views are often echoed in publications associated with conservative, right-wing publishers such as Bungei Shunjū and Sankei Shuppan. In response, two Japanese organizations have taken the lead in publishing material detailing the massacre and collecting related documents and accounts. The Study Group on the Nanjing Incident, founded by a group of historians in 1984, has published the most books responding directly to revisionist historians; the Center for Research and Documentation on Japan's War Responsibility, founded in 1993 by Yoshiaki Yoshimi, has published many materials in its own journal.

In 2004, Japanese Minister of Education Nariaki Nakayama, while discussing educational curricula’s treatment of Japanese colonial atrocities such as the “comfort women” issue, expressed a desire to move beyond what he described as “self-torturing” accounts of Japanese history.

In 2005, violent riots erupted in China over new history textbooks published by right-wing publisher Fusosha which were approved by the Japanese Ministry of Education.

In 2007, a group of Liberal Democratic Party (LDP) lawmakers denounced the Nanjing Massacre as a fabrication, arguing that there was no evidence to prove the allegations of mass killings by Japanese soldiers. They accused Beijing of using the alleged incident as a "political advertisement".

That same year, Xia Shuqin won a defamation of character suit against Japanese massacre denialists who argued that she had fabricated testimony relating to the death of seven of her eight family members during the Nanjing Massacre. Only eight at the time, Xia had herself been bayoneted, but survived, while her four-year-old sister escaped detection under the bed quilts.

== Sources ==
- Hata, Ikuhiko (1986). Nanjing Incident (南京事件―「虐殺」の構造. Nankin Jiken― Gyakusatsu no kozo). Chuo Koron Shinsho. ISBN 4-12-100795-6.
- Yamamoto, Shichihei (March 1972). "Reply to Katsuichi Honda". Every Gentlemen.
- Higashinakano, Syudo. The Truth of the Nanking Operation in 1937. Shogakukan.
- Higashinakano, S., Susumu, Kobayashi and Fukunaga, S. Analyzing the "Photographic Evidence" of the Nanking Massacre. Shogakukan.
- Tanaka, Massaki (1984). Fabrication of Nanjing Massacre. Nihon Kyobun Sha.
- The Truth about Nanjing (2007) a Japanese-produced documentary denying that any such massacre took place.
- Suzuki, Akira (April 1972). "The Phantom of The Nanjing Massacre". Every Gentlemen.
- Wakabayashi, Bob Tadashi, ed. (2008). The Nanking Atrocity 1937–38: Complicating the Picture.
- Yang, DaQing (June 1999). "Convergence or Divergence? Recent Historical Writings on the Rape of Nanjing". American Historical Review. 104 (3): 842–865. doi:10.2307/2650991. JSTOR 2650991. PMID 19291890.
