= Akira Fujiwara =

Japanese historian (1922–2003)

Akira Fujiwara (藤原 彰, Fujiwara Akira; 2 July 1922 – 26 February 2003) was a Japanese historian. His academic speciality was modern Japanese history and he was a professor emeritus at Hitotsubashi University. In 1980 he became a member of the Science Council of Japan and was a former chairman of the Historical Science Society of Japan.

== Life ==
He was born in Tokyo and after graduating from Rokuchu Tokyo Prefectural School, now Shinjuku Tokyo Metropolitan High School, in March 1940, he was part of the 55th graduating class at the Imperial Japanese Army Academy in July 1941 and the following December was deployed to North China as a trainee officer with the rank of Second Lieutenant attached to the 27th Division’s 3rd China Garrison Infantry Regiment. In March 1943 he was promoted to First Lieutenant and in April was put in charge of a company. In 1944 his division moved to a new front and participated in Operation Ichi-Go, after which he was promoted to captain. In March 1945 in the final stages of World War II he was ordered to transfer to mainland Japan and in June was appointed as commander of a battalion within the 524th Infantry Regiment of the 216th Division in preparation for the expected invasion of Japan. He survived the war and in November was sent into the reserves.

In May 1946 Fujiwara enrolled in history courses at the department of humanities at Tokyo Imperial University, now the University of Tokyo and graduated in March 1949. From 1954 to 1968 he worked as a part-time lecturer in the department of humanities and sciences at Chiba University. Then in 1967 he started a new job at Hitotsubashi University and in November accepted the position of associate professor in the department of sociology. In December 1969 he became a full professor and, in 1970, the head of his department. He left Hitotsubashi University in 1986 due to compulsory retirement but the same year got a part-time job as a lecturer in Rikkyo University’s department of humanities. Between 1989 and 1993 he was a professor at Kagawa Education Institute of Nutrition.

== Research ==
In the beginning he specialized in the medieval history of Japan but on the advice of Sho Ishimoda he switched to modern history and broke new ground in the history of the Showa period. He engaged in research on the modern history of Japan focusing on military and political history due to his experience as a professional soldier and his reflections on that. He was influenced academically by Kiyoshi Inoue.

Fujiwara’s name became widely known in 1955 when his book Shōwa Shi that he co-authored with fellow historians Shigeki Tooyama and Seiichi Imai became a bestseller. The writer Katsuichiro Kamei famously criticized the fundamental Marxist outlook of the book which divided Japanese society into a war-mongering ruling class and heroic anti-war resisters while ignoring the wavering majority who did not fit neatly into either. This dispute wound up involving many intellectuals including writers and historians and out of it the book Shōwa Shi Ronsō ("Controversies of Showa History") was developed.

Fujiwara was a prolific researcher of the Nanking Massacre and took the standpoint that the scale of the massacre reached 200,000 victims. Tokushi Kasahara has deemed that his research made a detailed re-examination of the atrocity applying methods and theories of historical research against his own experience in the army fighting on the battlefield, and analyzing it in the context of Japan’s military history, making special reference to the historical idiosyncrasies of the Japanese army and the latent contempt and discriminatory attitudes of the Japanese people towards China which reinforced them.

== Poison gas photograph scandal ==
On 31 October 1984 the morning edition of the Asahi Shimbun published over more than half of its front page a close-up black-and-white photograph of smoke like a wildfire or burning field billowing thickly with the headline of “Definitive photographic proof of poison gas use by the Japanese Imperial Army discovered”. Fujiwara Akira had deemed the photo to be of poison gas and he was introduced as “a historian and former army officer who is putting forward proof-positive research of chemical warfare in the Sino-Japanese War”. However, it was soon after questioned in a news report by the Sankei Shimbun whether it might be just a smoke screen, and later the same photograph was checked by volume 9 of the series Ketteiban Showa Shi ("Showa History: The Definitive Guide") published by Mainichi Shimbun in May 1984, and it was determined that there was nothing like poison gas in it. However, Asahi Shimbun was unapologetic and Fujiwara likewise did not once over the course of his life apologize or issue a correction.

== Concerning the Korean War ==
The established theory on the Korean War is that the North Koreans advanced across the 38th parallel and the American army, though taken by surprise, managed to rally. However, in Shōwa Shi Fujiwara and his co-authors wrote, “On the 23rd American Air Force fighter units stationed in Japan massed at Kitakyushu. Then on the 25th the South Korean army began to advance across the 38th parallel on the pretext that North Korea had made an incursion.” Fujiwara argued that South Korea was the aggressor and his writing strongly suggested that the US army was making preparations for the war. What’s more, Fujiwara held firm to his assertion that the Korean War started with South Korea’s “pre-emptive attack” up through the 1970s.

Motohiko Izawa has criticized a number of modern historians like Fujiwara in their belief that the North Korean side was just and that American imperialism and the South Koreans were the villains.

== Works ==
=== Sole author ===
- 『軍事史』（東洋経済新報社、1961年）
- 『日本帝国主義』（日本評論社、1968年）
- 『天皇制と軍隊』（青木書店、1978年）
- 『昭和の歴史（5）日中全面戦争』（小学館、1982年）
- 『戦後史と日本軍国主義』（新日本出版社、1982年）
- 『太平洋戦争史論』（青木書店、1982年）
- 『南京大虐殺』（岩波書店［岩波ブックレット］、1985年）
- 『日本軍事史』（日本評論社、1987年）
- 『世界の中の日本』（小学館、1989年）
- 『昭和天皇の15年戦争』（青木書店、1991年）
- 『南京の日本軍――南京大虐殺とその背景』（大月書店、1997年）
- 『餓死した英霊たち』（青木書店、2001年）ISBN 4250201155
- 『中国戦線従軍記』（大月書店、2002年）
- 『日本軍事史［戦前篇・戦後篇］』（社会批評社、2007年）

=== As a co-author ===
- （遠山茂樹・今井清一）『昭和史』（岩波書店、1955年）
- （遠山茂樹・今井清一）『日本近代史（全3巻）』（岩波書店、1975年-1977年）
- （功刀俊洋・伊藤悟・吉田裕）『天皇の昭和史』（新日本出版社、1984年）
- （荒川章二・林博史）『日本現代史――1945→1985』（大月書店、1986年）
- （粟屋憲太郎・吉田裕・山田朗）『徹底検証・昭和天皇「独白録」』（大月書店、1991年）
- （安斎育郎）『戦争から平和へ――21世紀の選択』（かもがわ出版、1994年）
- （南京事件調査研究会）『南京大虐殺否定論13のウソ』（柏書房、 1999年）（著者は 井上久士、小野賢二、笠原十九司、藤原彰、吉田裕、本多勝一、渡辺春巳）

=== As an editor ===
- 『日本民衆の歴史（10）占領と民衆運動』（三省堂、1975年）
- 『日本民衆の歴史（11）民衆の時代へ』（三省堂、1976年）
- 『日本民衆の歴史（8）弾圧の嵐のなかで』（三省堂、1978年）
- 『日本民衆の歴史（9）戦争と民衆』（三省堂、1978年）
- 『体系日本現代史（6）冷戦下の日本』（日本評論社、1979年）
- 『資料日本現代史（1）軍隊内の反戦運動』（大月書店、1980年）
- 『ロシアと日本――日ソ歴史学シンポジウム』（彩流社、1985年）
- 『沖縄戦と天皇制』（立風書房、1987年）
- 『沖縄戦――国土が戦場になったとき』（青木書店、1987年）
- 『南京事件をどうみるか――日・中・米研究者による検証』（青木書店、1998年）

=== As a co-editor ===
- （今井清一・大江志乃夫）『近代日本史の基礎知識――史実の正確な理解のために』（有斐閣、1972年）
- （松尾尊兌）『論集現代史』（筑摩書房、1976年）
- （野沢豊）『日本ファシズムと東アジア――現代史シンポジウム』（青木書店、1977年）
- （功刀俊洋）『資料日本現代史（8）満洲事変と国民動員』（大月書店、1983年）
- （雨宮昭一）『現代史と「国家秘密法」』（未來社、1985年）
- （洞富雄・本多勝一）『南京事件を考える』（大月書店、1987年）
- （今井清一）『十五年戦争史（全4巻）』（青木書店、 1988年-1989年）
- （今井清一・宇野俊一・粟屋憲太郎）『日本近代史の虚像と実像（全4巻）』（大月書店、 1989年-1990年）
- （荒井信一）『現代史における戦争責任――現代史シンポジウム』（青木書店、1990年）
- （洞富雄・本多勝一）『南京大虐殺の研究』（晩聲社、1992年）
- （粟屋憲太郎・吉田裕）『昭和20年/1945年――最新資料をもとに徹底検証する』（小学館、1995年）
- （塩田庄兵衛・長谷川正安）『日本戦後史資料』（新日本出版社、1995年）
- （小野賢二・本多勝一）『南京大虐殺を記録した皇軍兵士たち―第十三師団山田支隊兵士の陣中日記』（大月書店、1996年）
- （森田俊男）『藤岡信勝氏の「歴史教育・平和教育」論批判』（大月書店、1996年）
- （姫田光義）『日中戦争下中国における日本人の反戦活動』（青木書店、1999年）
- （新井利男）『侵略の証言――中国における日本人戦犯自筆供述書』（岩波書店、1999年）
