= Kenichi Ara =

Japanese political activist (born 1944)

Kenichi Ara (阿羅 健一, Ara Kenichi; born February 9, 1944) is a Japanese political commentator and researcher on modern history. Until the 1980s, he used the pen name Hideo Hatakenaka.

He is associated with the far-right and has participated in a number of organizations to promote far-right causes. Currently he is chairman of the Chūgoku no Kōnichi Kinenkan no Futō na Shashin no Tekkyo o Motomeru Kokumin no Kai, which seeks the removal of "inappropriate photographs" from war museums in China, and is advisor to both the Tamogami Ronbun to Jieikan no Meiyo o Kangaeru Kai, which supports Toshio Tamogami, and the ultranationalist Shuken Kaifuku o Mezasu Kai.

He was born in Sendai in Miyagi Prefecture and is a graduate of Sendai Niko High School and the Faculty of Literature at Tohoku University. He worked at King Records from the spring of 1966 but retired around the age of 40.

== Principal writings ==
Ara publishes essays mainly in the conservative magazines Seiron and Shokun.

Between May 1986 and May 1987 he published a series of oral testimonies from witnesses of the Nanjing Incident of 1937 in the pages of Seiron Magazine which were released in book form in 1987 and then re-edited and re-released in 2002.

The book was poorly received by mainstream historians. Ikuhiko Hata stated that "It’s plain to see that his strategy is to avoid the people who will give evidence of atrocities and seek out only those who assert their innocence and thus conclude that nothing improper happened". Tokushi Kasahara also noted that both editions of the book cut out inconvenient testimonies from the original Seiron articles.

In his book Saikenshō: Nankin De Hontō Wa Nani Ga Okotta No Ka he alleges that the person who sheltered Yoon Bong-Gil prior to his 29 April 1932 bombing in Shanghai was George Ashmore Fitch.

== Works ==
=== Books ===
- 『聞き書 南京事件 日本人の見た南京虐殺事件』 （図書出版社、1987年）現在絶版
- 阿羅健一 (1994). ジャカルタ夜明け前: インドネシア独立に賭けた人たち. 勁草書房. ISBN 978-4-326-65154-2.
- 阿羅健一 (2002). 「南京事件」日本人48人の証言. 小学館. ISBN 978-4-09-402546-0.
- 『南京「事件」研究の最前線 : 日本「南京」学会年報. 2005・06年合併版』 阿羅健一ほか共著（展転社、平成17年/2005年）ISBN 4-88656-279-5
- 『【再検証】南京で本当は何が起こったのか』（徳間書店、2007年） ISBN 978-4-19-862430-9
- 阿羅健一 (2008). 日中戦争はドイツが仕組んだ: 上海戦とドイツ軍事顧問団のナゾ. 小学館. ISBN 978-4-09-387814-2.

=== Edited volumes ===
- （野田毅） 『野田日記』（展転社、2007年）ISBN 4886563112

=== Articles ===
- 「架空だった南京大虐殺の証拠 謎の「崇善堂」とその実態」『正論』1985年10月号
- 「反日プロパガンダに使われる日本の"謝罪金" 村山元首相がばらまいた金の行方」1999年6月号
- 《「南京事件」今改めて見直すべき日本人48人の証言の「真実」》『SAPIO』2002年）2月27日号
- 「『南京戦・元兵士102人の証言』のデタラメさ」『正論』2002年11月号
- 「百人斬り訴訟レポート 名誉回復のその日まで」『正論』2003年12月号
- 「『中国の南京「虐殺」宣伝に風穴を』」日本青年協議会 機関誌『祖国と青年』2003年2月号
