= Comfort Women and Sex in the Battle Zone =

Comfort Women and Sex in the Battle Zone is a historical publication by Japanese historian Ikuhiko Hata who is widely regarded as being a "conservative" historian or a "centrist" on Japanese history. He has written extensively on such controversial subjects as the Nanjing Massacre and the comfort women. The book was first published in English by Hamilton Books in 2018. The book is a revised and updated translation of Hata's influential 1999 Japanese-language study, offering a comprehensive examination of the "comfort women" system established by the Japanese military before and during World War II.

== Background and publication ==
The English edition of Comfort Women and Sex in the Battle Zone was published by Hamilton Books, a division of Rowman and Littlefield, in 2018. This edition expands upon the original Japanese text, incorporating new research and addressing developments in the international discourse on comfort women since the 1990s.

== Reception and Controversy ==
Comfort Women and Sex in the Battle Zone has been both praised and criticized by historians. Supporters highlight its value as a definitive scholarly resource, while critics argue that it downplays the extent of coercion and the suffering of the women involved. Hata has been criticzed by historians for being suspectible to political pressure, for example in publications around 2007, Ikuhiko Hata had estimated the number of comfort women to have been more likely between 10,000 and 20,000. Hata claims that "none of the comfort women were forcibly recruited". Historian Chunghee Sarah Soh noted that Hata's initial estimate was at approximately 90,000, but he reduced that figure to 20,000 for political reasons. He has been criticized by other Japanese scholars for minimizing the hardship of comfort women.
