= Ishimoda Shō =

Japanese historian (1912–1986)

- 石母田 正
- Born: September 9, 1912; Japan Hokkaido Sapporo
- Died: January 18, 1986 (aged 73)
- Occupation: historian

Ishimoda Shō (石母田 正; 9 September 1912 – 18 January 1986), born in Sapporo, was a Japanese historian specializing in ancient Japanese history, with a particular interest in the nature of the structural transition from the ancient to the medieval period. As an orthodox materialist, he was a lifetime member of the Communist Party, and influential Marxist scholar in the analyses on Japanese history conducted by members of the post-war Rekiken group. In the 1950s, after the success of the Chinese Communist Revolution in 1949, he espoused that model as the Asian alternative to Westernization, which had failed in Japan.

== Life ==
Born in his mother's family house in Hokkaidō, Ishimoda was raised in what is now Ishinomaki city, Miyagi Prefecture, where his father was mayor. He enrolled in the faculty of philosophy at Tokyo Imperial University, but switched to Japanese history. On graduation he became a journalist for the Asahi Shimbun, then professor at Hosei University. In 1973 he was diagnosed as suffering from Parkinson's disease.

== Works ==
His first major work "The formation of the medieval world" was written before the war. but the manuscript was destroyed when his house went up in flames during a wartime incendiary bombing raid over Tokyo. A legend often mentioned by prominent academics to their students has it that, soon after war's end, he returned to what remained of his house, shut himself in for a summer and rewrote the whole work. According to the afterword by Ishii Susumu appended to a popular reprint of this work however, he secluded himself in a room of his home in October 1944, and, with the curtains drawn, wrote out the whole 700 page manuscript within just one month.

Recently Ishimoda's historical materialism has come in for criticism. However it cannot be denied that he prompted and quickened the reconstruction of the discipline in postwar world of Japanese historical studies, which at the time was caught up in the chaos and stagnation caused by the collapse of an historicism centered on Japan's Imperial institution.

== Bibliography ==
Aoki Kazuo (青木和夫) is now editing the Collected Works of Ishimoda Shō (Ishimoda Shō Chosakushū), published by Iwanami Shoten in 16 volumes.
