= Saburō Ienaga =

Japanese historian (1913–2002)

- 家永三郎
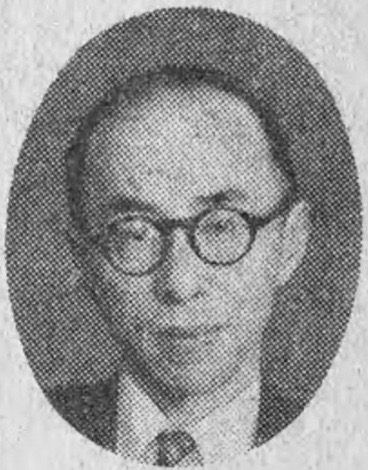
- Born: September 3, 1913; Nagoya, Empire of Japan
- Died: November 29, 2002 (aged 89)
- Occupation: Historian
- Known for: Campaign against censorship on Japanese war crimes
- Notable work: New Japanese History

Saburō Ienaga (家永 三郎, Ienaga Saburō; September 3, 1913 – November 29, 2002) was a Japanese historian. In 1953, the Japanese Ministry of Education published a textbook by Ienaga, but censored what they said were factual errors and matters of opinion, regarding Japanese war crimes. Ienaga undertook a series of lawsuits against the Ministry for violation of his freedom of speech. He was nominated for the Nobel Peace Prize in 1999 and 2001 by Noam Chomsky among others. He also recorded the history of the Japanese resistance in World War II in his book The Pacific War, 1931–1945.

== Life ==
Ienaga was born in Nagoya. He entered Tokyo's Kudan High School in 1926, and graduated from the University of Tokyo in 1937. Following his graduation, he served as a professor at Tokyo University of Education (東京教育大, today's University of Tsukuba) from 1949 to 1977, and at Chuo University from 1977 to 1984. In 1984, he was awarded the Japan Academy Prize and became professor emeritus at Tokyo University of Education.

== Background of the lawsuit ==
In April 1947, Ienaga published New Japanese History (新日本史) as a general history book. Upon request from Sanseidō, Ienaga wrote a draft of a Japanese history textbook for high school based on his New Japanese History. The draft was, however, rejected by the Ministry of Education at the school textbook authorization of 1952. The reasons for rejection included such grounds as the claim that the description of the High Treason Incident (大逆事件) was not appropriate, and that the draft did not clarify the fact that the Russo-Japanese War was supported by the Japanese people. Ienaga reapplied for authorization without any alterations, and the draft somehow passed authorization and was published as a textbook for the school year of 1953, under the same title, "New Japanese History".

After wholly revising the first edition of the textbook, Ienaga applied again for authorization of the textbook in 1955. The draft passed authorization on the condition that 216 items in the draft be altered. The Ministry of Education demanded that Ienaga correct the suggested elements two times subsequently. Ienaga made several alterations, but refused several others. The revised New Japanese History was published in 1956. After the curriculum guidelines (学習指導要領) for high school social studies changed in 1955, Ienaga applied for authorization for the third and fourth editions of his textbook in November 1956 and May 1957. They went through the same process as the 1955 edition and were authorized for publication in 1959 and 1962 respectively.

== First lawsuit ==
On June 12, 1965, Ienaga filed the first suit against the government of Japan. He demanded ¥1,000,000 (equivalent to ¥4,600,000 in 2024) under the State Redress Law (国家賠償法) for the psychological damage that he suffered from the government's allegedly unconstitutional system of school textbook authorization making him correct the contents of his draft textbook against his will and violating his right to freedom of expression. Ienaga claimed that the system of textbook authorization, which is based on Articles 21 and 51 of the School Education Law (学校教育法) among others, was unjust and unconstitutional because:

The authorization system was against Article 21 of the constitution that guarantees the freedom of speech and expression. Writing and publication of history textbook is a form of speech that is protected by the Constitution; however, the system of school textbook authorization as it was practiced in 1965 conducted thought control and prohibited publication and use of textbooks at schools that were deemed inappropriate according to a particular political ideology held by the government. According to Ienaga this falls under the category of censorship (検閲) that is prohibited by Section 2, Article 21 of the Constitution of Japan. Article 21 specifically prohibits censorship in an independent section because it is the principle of the democratic constitution of Japan that the people are guaranteed the opportunities to freely enjoy the results of scholastic researches, be exposed to all sorts of ideas and opinions, and know socio-political reality and historical truth through various media such as press, radio, and television.

The authorization system was against Article 10 of Fundamental Law of Education (教育基本法) that states that education shall not submit to unjust control. This is from reflection on the past that the pre-war education system of Japan attempted to control thought by standardizing and uniforming education. Therefore, the content of education ought to be left unstandardized and be free from uniformalization by the political authority, Ienaga argued.

At the first trial (filed by Ienaga on June 12, 1965, ruled on July 16, 1974, at Tokyo District Court), Judge Takatsu ruled that the textbook authorization system could not be deemed censorship as defined in the Article 21 of the Constitution because such a system should be allowed on the ground of public welfare, while ordering the state to compensate Ienaga 100,000 yen for a certain abuse of discretion.

At the second trial (filed by Ienaga on July 26, 1974, ruled on March 19, 1986, at Tokyo High Court), Judge Suzuki wholly adopted the claim of the state and denied any abuse of discretion in the authorization process.

At the third trial (filed by Ienaga on March 20, 1986, ruled on March 16, 1993, at Supreme Court), Judge Kabe followed the verdict of the second trial and rejected the appeal.

== Second lawsuit ==
Ienaga filed an administrative lawsuit to demand the Ministry of Education to reverse the rejection of his New Japanese History at the textbook authorization in 1966.

At the first trial (filed by Ienaga on June 12, 1965, ruled on July 16, 1974, at Tokyo District Court), Judge Sugimoto ruled that authorization that affects the content of the description of textbooks is against Article 10 of the Fundamental Law of Education, and that the authorization falls under the category of censorship as defined in Section 2, Article 21 of the Constitution, and demanded the state reverse its decision.

At the second trial (filed by the state on July 24, 1970, ruled on December 20, 1975, at Tokyo High Court), Judge Azakami rejected the appeal by the state on the ground that the decision of the authorization lacks consistency.

At the third trial (filed by the state on December 30, 1975, ruled on April 8, 1982, at Supreme Court), the Supreme Court reversed and remanded the appeal to the high court as the curriculum guideline had already been revised since the time of the first lawsuit and as the result there is no longer any merit in requesting reversal of Ministry's decision.

At the fourth trial (ruled on June 27, 1989, at Tokyo High Court), the judge rejected the ruling of the first trial since the plaintiff has already lost interest in requesting the reversal of the rejection of his textbook.

== Third lawsuit ==
Ienaga filed a suit against the government of Japan to demand state compensation for the result of textbook authorization in 1982 that rejected his draft textbook.

At the first trial (filed by Ienaga on January 1, 1984, ruled on October 3, 1989, at Tokyo District Court), Judge Kato ruled that while the authorization system itself was constitutional, there was a certain abuse of discretion on the part of the Ministry regarding the unconstitutional censoring of the description of sōmōtai (草莽隊), and ordered the state to compensate Ienaga 100,000 yen.

At the second trial (filed by the state on October 13, 1989, ruled on October 20, 1993, at Tokyo High Court), Judge Kawakami ruled that while the authorization system itself was constitutional, there was a certain abuse of discretion on the part of the Ministry regarding the unconstitutional censoring of the descriptions of Nanking Massacre and sexual assaults by the military in addition to sōmōtai, and ordered the state to compensate Ienaga 300,000 yen.

At the third trial (filed by Ienaga on October 25, 1993, ruled on August 29, 1997, at Supreme Court), Judge Ono ruled that while the authorization system itself was constitutional, there was a certain abuse of discretion on the part of the Ministry regarding the unconstitutional censoring of the descriptions of Unit 731, sexual assaults at Nanking in addition to sōmōtai, and ordered the state to pay Ienaga 400,000 yen as compensation.

== Works ==
- History of Japan. Tokyo: Japan Travel Bureau, 1964.
- Ichi Rekishi Gakusha No Ayumi, translated as Japan's Past, Japan's Future: One Historian's Odyssey. Lanham, Maryland: Rowman & Littlefield, Publishers, 2001. ISBN 0-7425-0989-3. Ienaga's autobiography.
- Taiheiyō Sensō. Tokyo: Iwanami Shoten, 1968. Written as a counterweight to the controversial history textbooks, it attempts to survey the reasons for and the conduct of the Pacific War from 1931 to 1945. Translated and entitled variously:
  - The Pacific War, 1931–1945: A Critical Perspective on Japan's Role in World War II. New York: Pantheon Books, 1978. ISBN 0-394-73496-3.
  - The Pacific War: World War II and the Japanese, 1931–1945. New York: Pantheon Books, 1978. ISBN 0-394-49762-7.
  - Japan's Last War: World War II and the Japanese, 1931–1945. Canberra: Australian National University Press, 1979. ISBN 0-7081-0312-X.
- Yamatoe. John M. Shields, translator. Translated as Painting in the Yamato style. New York" Weatherhill, 1973. ISBN 0-8348-1016-6.
- Japanese Art: A Cultural Appreciation. Tr. by Richard L. Gage. New York: Weatherhill, 1979. ISBN 0-8348-1046-8.

== See also ==
- Tomio Hora
- Japanese Devils
- Japanese resistance during the Shōwa period
