= Harold John Timperley =

Australian journalist

Harold John Timperley (1898–1954) was an Australian journalist, known for reporting in China in the 1930s and writing the book What War Means (1938) based on it. The Japanese historian Hora Tomio described What War Means as "a book which shocked awake Western intellectuals".

== Life ==
Born in Bunbury Western Australia, Timperley started his journalistic career in Perth, Western Australia aged just 16 working as a cadet reporter for the Daily News. In 1916 he enlisted in the 22nd reinforcement for the 11th Battalion of the Australian Imperial Force (AIF) and in January 1918 he was shipped to France to join his battalion which was involved in some of the fiercest fighting that year. Upon returning to Australia in 1919, Harold returned to the Daily News but later joined the staff of Perth's West Australian Newspaper where he remained until departing for Hong Kong in 1921 to work at the China Mail.. Later in China, we worked for Reuters and reported for the Manchester Guardian from 1928, based in Beiping (1921–1936), Shanghai (1936 – Apr? 1937, Sep 1937 – Apr 1938) and Nanjing (May? – Sep 1937). He became an advisory editor of ASIA magazine in 1934 (see ASIA of November, 1938). He married Elizabeth Chambers in Nanjing in August 1937.

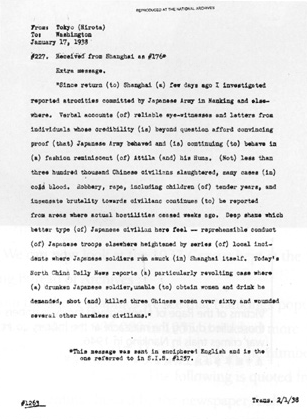
Timperley's telegram regarding the Nanjing Massacre, intercepted and decoded by the Americans on 17 January 1938

After the Japanese invasion, his accounts of the Guardian were some of the firsthand information most easily available in the West. His cables from Shanghai, although at times censored, formed the basis for some early writing on the Nanjing massacre from 1937 to 1938.

Timperley left Shanghai for London early April 1938. There, he published the book What War Means, which was edited by him and contains direct testimony as well as official documents. It received great attention, being published in the US under the title The Japanese Terror in China. Its content has been contested by Japanese historians, including Minoru Kitamura. Minoru Kitamura proposed a view that Timperley did not appear as a witness in Nanjing War Crimes Tribunal and International Military Tribunal for the Far East because he might have been a spin doctor.

He continued to write on topics connected with Japan, including the nationalist thinker Yoshida Shoin, until the end of the Pacific War. From 1943, he worked for the Information Office of United Nations (Allied Powers). From 1946, he worked for UNRRA at its Shanghai office. In 1947, the United Nations Security Council established the Good Offices Committee for Indonesia to sponsor negotiations between the country and the Netherlands, and Timperley was assigned as Deputy Principal Secretary (later to an Acting Principal Secretary) of the committee (from May 1948?) until 20 October 1948. Afterward, he worked for UNESCO in Paris.

Leaving UNESCO in 1950, Timperley went to Indonesia as a technical advisor to the Indonesian Ministry of Foreign Affairs. However a tropical disease forced him to leave Jakarta for London in 1951. Not long after his arrival in London, he came in touch with the Religious Society of Friends and was admitted to the membership in 1952. From January 1954, he threw himself into supporting the War on Want campaign and acted as full-time voluntary office worker. He organized the first War on Want Conference in May 1954.

On 25 November 1954, he was found unconscious in bed and taken to a Cuckfield hospital, but he died the following day (26 November 1954).

In January 2026, Brendan Cook's biography of Harold Timperley A Man of Exquisite Honour was published by Earnshaw Books.

== Works ==
- What War Means: The Japanese Terror in China, London, Victor Gollancz Ltd,1938. (There are two editions, Left Book Club and non LBC editions.)
- The Japanese Terror in China, New York, Modern Age Books, 1938.
- Japan: A World Problem, New York, The John Day Company, 1942.
- Australia and the Australians, New York, Oxford University Press, 1942.
- Some Contrast Between China and Japan in The Light of History /10-page leaflet, London, The China Society, publication date unknown.
- The War on Want /5-page leaflet, London, Gledhill & Ballinger Ltd., 1953.
