= Ikuhiko Hata =

Japanese historian (born 1932)

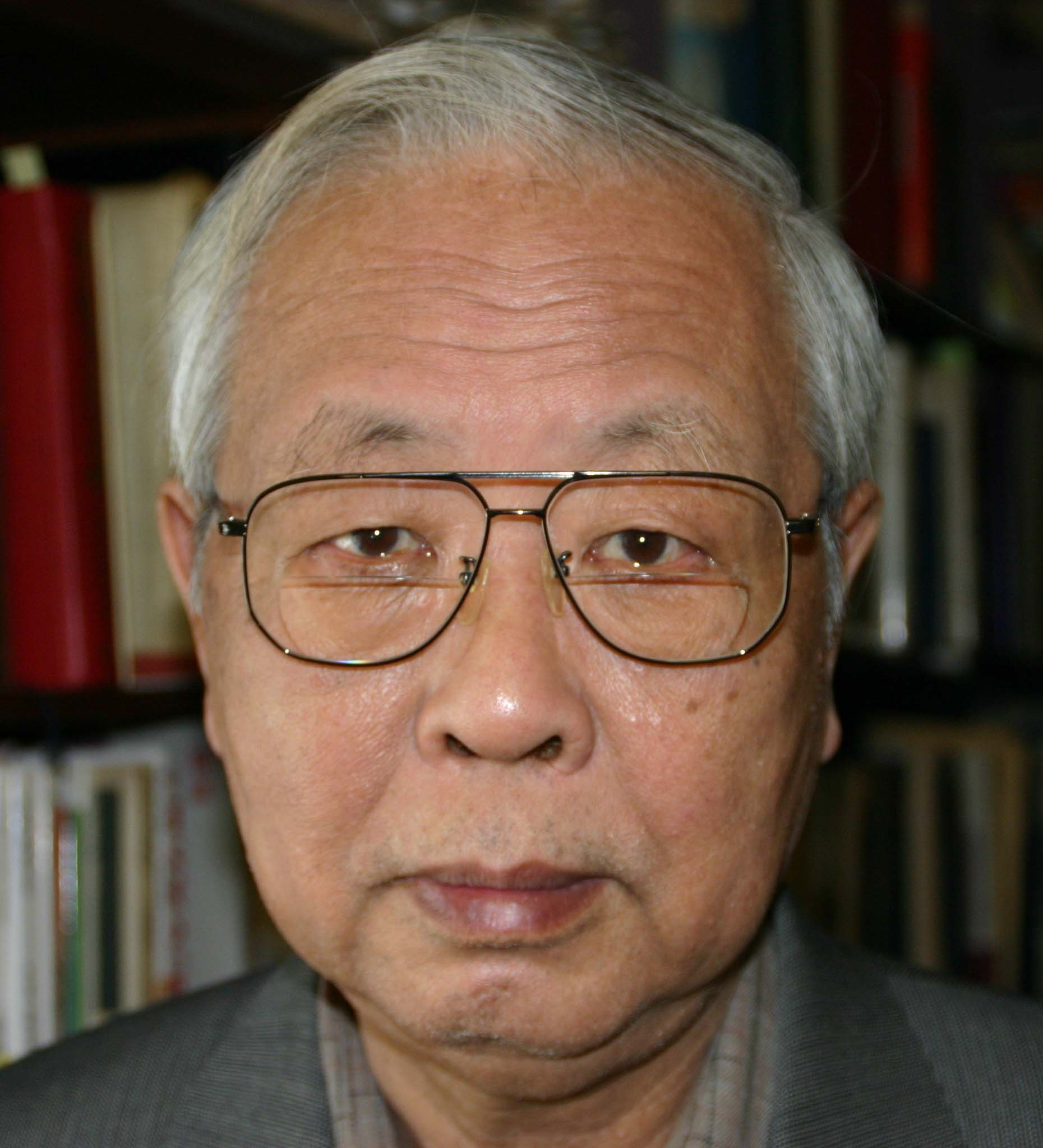
- Born: 12 December 1932 (age 93); Hōfu, Japan
- Education: University of Tokyo (BA, PhD)
- Spouse: Kazuko (m. 1973)
- Awards: Kikuchi Kan Prize
- Scientific career
- Fields: Japanese history; modern history; military history
- Workplaces: Japanese Ministry of Finance; Takushoku University; Chiba University; Nihon University

Ikuhiko Hata (秦 郁彦, Hata Ikuhiko; born 12 December 1932) is a Japanese historian. He earned his PhD at the University of Tokyo and has taught history at several universities. He is the author of a number of influential and well-received scholarly works, particularly on topics related to Japan's role in the Second Sino-Japanese War and World War II.

He has written extensively on such controversial subjects as the Nanjing Massacre and the comfort women. He does not believe that comfort women were coerced by the Japanese military to work. Fellow historian Edward Drea has called him "the doyen of Japanese military historians". Hata is variously regarded as being a "conservative" historian or a "centrist".

== Education and career ==
Ikuhiko Hata was born on 12 December 1932 in the city of Hōfu in Yamaguchi Prefecture. He graduated from the University of Tokyo in 1956 and received his PhD there in 1974. He worked as chief historian of the Japanese Ministry of Finance between 1956 and 1976 and during this period from 1963 to 1965 he was also a research assistant at Harvard University. After resigning his post at the Finance Ministry Hata served as a visiting professor at Princeton University from 1977 to 1978 and then was a history professor at Takushoku University from 1980 to 1993, at Chiba University from 1994 to 1997, and at Nihon University from 1997 to 2002.

== Scholarship ==
Hata has been described by numerous historians as an important scholar on the history of modern Japan. Edward Drea has called him "the doyen of Japanese military historians," and has written that Hata's "published works are models of scholarship, research, accuracy, and judicious interpretation." Joshua A. Fogel, a historian of China at York University, called Hata "an eminent scholar who has for over forty years been writing numerous excellent studies of Japan at war." Masahiro Yamamoto called Hata "a leading Japanese scholar in the field of Japan's modern history."

Hata's first history book, Nicchū Sensōshi ("A History of the Second Sino-Japanese War"), was released in 1961; he began the research while completing his bachelor's degree at the University of Tokyo. The work was well-received, described by Chalmers Johnson as "the most thorough study of Japanese policies in China during the 1930s," and by James T.C. Liu as "a welcome and pioneering contribution." Fifty years after its publication, Edward Drea and Tobe Ryoichi called it "a classic account" of the war. Hata's second book, the 1962 work Gun fashizumu undō shi ("A History of the Military Fascist Movement"), was promoted by the historian Shuhei Domon as "a first-rate narrative interpretation based on extensive use of documentary evidence."

The Japan Association of International Relations selected Hata to be part of what historian James William Morley described as, a team of "young, objective diplomatic and military historians," given unprecedented access to primary source records in order to write a history of the origins of the Second World War in Asia. The resulting study, Taiheiyō sensō e no michi ("The Road to the Pacific War"), was published between 1962 and 1963, and translated into English during the 1970s and 1980s. Hata contributed three essays to the series. Roger Dingman described the first, "The Japanese-Soviet Confrontation, 1935–1939," as "a wealth of new data," and praised the second, "The Army's Move into Northern Indochina," for demonstrating "brilliantly how peaceful passage through northern Indochina became forceful occupation." Mark Peattie wrote that Hata's third essay, "The Marco Polo Bridge Incident 1937," was "the best overview we now have in English" of the event. Hata would later expand it into a full-length book, which Edward Drea and Tobe Ryoichi appraised as "the single best source on the incident."

Starting in 1968 Hata headed a team of scholars with a task from the Ministry of Education to analyze all available sources and documents on the workings of the wartime and prewar armed forces of Japan. The fruit of their research was Nihon Rikukaigun no Seido, Soshiki, Jinji ("Institutions, Organization, and Personnel of the Japanese Army and Navy"), released in 1971, which Mark Peattie called "the authoritative reference work in the field". Soon after Hata was tasked with coordinating another collaborative research project, this one for the Finance Ministry, on the subject of the occupation of Japan by the United States after World War II. John W. Dower, Sadao Asada, and Roger Dingman credited Hata for the key role he played in producing the multivolume project, which began to be published in 1975, and deemed it the best work of scholarship on the occupation produced until that point.

In 1993 Hata wrote a two-volume work on controversial incidents in modern Japanese history, entitled Shōwashi no nazo wo ou ("Chasing the Riddles of Showa History"), which was awarded the Kikuchi Kan Prize.

Hata co-wrote two books with Yasuho Izawa on Japanese fighter aces of World War II, both of which were described by historians as the definitive treatments of the subject.

A work Hata had written in 1984, Hirohito Tennō Itsutsu no Ketsudan ("Emperor Hirohito's Five Decisions"), attracted the attention of Marius Jansen, who arranged to have it translated into English as Hirohito: The Showa Emperor in War and Peace. According to Edward Drea, on the question of "whether the emperor was really Japan's ruler and power-holder or merely a puppet and robot ... [Hata] concludes that the answer to this complex question lies somewhere in between, although Hata credits Hirohito with considerable political savvy." Apart from Drea the book also garnered highly positive reviews from Stephen S. Large and Hugh Cortazzi.

=== Nankin Jiken and Nanjing Massacre death toll estimates ===
Hata's major contribution to Nanjing (Nanking) Massacre studies is his book Nankin jiken ("The Nanjing Incident"), published in 1986, which is a detailed study of the event based on Japanese, Chinese, and English sources that was later noted by historians such as Daqing Yang to be one of the few impartial works of scholarship written on the massacre during the period. The book is known for its relatively low estimate of the death toll, which Hata put at up to 40,000, basing the number of deaths on the work of Lewis S. C. Smythe. Smythe's survey of the massacre, War Damage in Nanking Area, Dec.1937 to March 1938, Urban and Rural Surveys, was conducted during the immediate aftermath of the incident, and excluded the deaths of Chinese soldiers.

Nankin jiken is acknowledged as the first study to discuss what might have caused the massacre, whereas previous books had focused only on the event itself. Hata considered the Japanese Army's lack of military police, facilities to detain POWs, its ignorance of international laws, along with General Tang Shengzhi's decision to flee the city without a formal surrender - leaving a large number of plain-clothed soldiers mixed in with the civilian population ahead of excessive mopping-up operations by the Japanese - as among the factors which led to the slaughter.

Some contemporary researchers, including historian Tomio Hora and journalist Katsuichi Honda, expressed strong disagreement with Hata's death toll estimate, though both expressed admiration for Hata's scholarship and sincerity. Hata is today recognized as the major scholar of a so-called "centrist" school of thought on the Nanjing Massacre, which in terms of the death toll believes that tens of thousands were killed - thus standing between the "great massacre" school, which believes that hundreds of thousands were killed, and the "illusion" school, of Nanjing Massacre deniers. Takuji Kimura has criticized Hata as a "minimizer" of the atrocity, while acknowledging that his book on the massacre was "an excellent study." Herbert Bix has described Hata as "the most notorious" of the "partial deniers" of the Nanjing Massacre. Historians Haruo Tohmatsu and H. P. Willmott have stated that Hata's estimate for the death toll is regarded in Japan as being "the most academically reliable estimate."

In November 1997 during a conference at Princeton University, Hata was confronted by Iris Chang, author of the book The Rape of Nanking, who asked Hata why he doubted the testimony of Japanese POWs who had stated that hundreds of thousands of Chinese were killed during the atrocity. After Hata replied that torture and coercion of Japanese POWs made their testimony unreliable, Chang walked out. The audience became unruly, shouting Hata down and yelling insults, and moderator Perry Link had difficulty keeping the discussion under control. In the wake of this incident, similar disruptions by Chinese students disagreeing with his estimate of the death toll prevented Hata from speaking at a number of universities he visited. Bob Wakabayashi of York University, argues that Hata became more strident in his tone following these attacks, once calling it the "Nanking industry" in comparison with Norman Finkelstein's "Holocaust industry."

By 1999, Nankin jiken was in its nineteenth printing, and was continuing to receive plaudits from scholars. In 2000 Marius Jansen endorsed it as "the most reasonable of many Japanese studies" on the massacre. In 2001, prominent Nanjing Massacre scholar Yutaka Yoshida, despite disagreeing with its death toll estimate, considered Nankin jiken among the top five books he recommends that people read on the Nanjing Massacre. In 2003, Joshua Fogel said the book was "still an authority in the field," and Ritsumeikan University professor David Askew designated it "the best introductory work on the Nanjing Incident in any language."

During the 1980s, Hata stated that the death toll was betweeon 38,000 to 42,000, while holding out the possibility that it might have been as high as 60,000. However, when writing the second edition of Nankin jiken in 2007, Hata indicated he now believed that 42,000 deaths during the massacre was the maximum possible, and that the true number may have been lower.

=== Research on comfort women ===
Hata is considered a leading historian on the subject of the comfort women who served alongside the Japanese Army in during the 1930s and 1940s. He is credited with being the first researcher to expose as fraudulent the testimony of Seiji Yoshida, who claimed to have kidnapped Korean women for the Japanese military. Hata, who argues that comfort women were not sex slaves but by-and-large willing prostitutes, with a minority of them being sold by their parents, with no direct involvement by Japanese military outside of several incidents in South East Asia; he considered the number of comfort women as 20,000 at most. Hata summarized his views on the issue, saying:

"None of them were forcibly recruited. Forty percent of them were from Japan, the most heavily represented nation. Many were sold to brokers by their parents. Some responded willingly to brokers' offers; others were deceived. I would add that, on the average, living conditions in the comfort stations were practically identical to those in brothels set up for American troops during the Vietnam War.

Hata expanded his research into the 1999 book, Ianfu to senjō no sei (translated into English in 2018 as "Comfort Women and Sex in the Battle Zone"). Described by historian Chunghee Sarah Soh as "a 444-page treatise on the comfort women issue," Soh wrote that Hata had put the total number of comfort women at 90,000 in 1993, arguing he later revised the number downward because of a "political alignment with the conservative anti-redress camp in Japan that emerged in the latter half of the 1990s."

Ianfu to senjō no sei was noted for its extensive compilation of information, being praised by historian Haruo Tohmatsu as "probably the most well documented study on the question," and by Mainichi Shimbun reporter Takao Yamada as "an encyclopedia-like collection of facts on comfort women." In The International History Review, A. Hamish Ion stated that with this work, Hata had succeeded in creating "a measured evaluation in the face of sensational and supposedly ill-researched studies by George Hicks and others." The book was also favorably reviewed by political scientist Itaru Shimazu, and journalist Takaaki Ishii. Historian Hirofumi Hayashi criticized the work for faulty use of documents, among them a case where Hata cited a document as listing 650 comfort women allocated to five prefectures, when in fact the document listed 400 comfort women.

Hata, who supports the retraction of the Kono Statement on comfort women, was the only historian appointed to the committee established by the government of Shinzō Abe to re-examine the statement. In 2015 Hata led of group of Japanese historians requesting that the publisher McGraw-Hill make corrections to what they believed were erroneous descriptions of the comfort women in a world history textbook published in the United States.

== Ideological leanings ==
Hata's general ideological leanings have been described in a variety of manners. Some sources have referred to him as being a right-leaning scholar, such as Thomas U. Berger who has called him, "a highly respected conservative Japanese historian". Others, however, find characterizing Hata in these terms to be inaccurate, such as military historian Masahiro Yamamoto who notes that in the historical debate on the Nanjing Massacre Hata was a centrist who actually leaned closer to the "traditionalist" scholars than the conservative "revisionists". Takao Yamada likewise points out that Hata has criticized all sides in historical controversies and he argues that Hata can be better described as a "positivist".

Hata is known as a strong opponent of the attempts by some Japanese nationalists to revise Japan's wartime history in a way that he deems ideologically biased. Hata, whom The Wall Street Journal described as an advocate of the "we-did-wrong view" of Japanese history, has expressed grave concern about the advent of new historical revisionists seeking to apologize for Japan's wartime aggressions and absolve former Prime Minister Hideki Tojo. In 1995 Hata stepped down from a government commission on the construction of a new war museum near Yasukuni Shrine in fear that the project would be used to glorify Japan's wartime actions. He favors the de-enshrinement of war criminals from Yasukuni Shrine and is also a critic of Yūshūkan, a museum near the shrine, for its nationalist-inspired portrayal of Japanese history. While he has been strongly critical of efforts by Japanese nationalist groups to alter history textbooks, Hata also agreed to testify for the Ministry of Education against left-wing historian Saburō Ienaga who believed that his textbook was being censored by the Japanese government. Hata has supported the work of the Japanese Society for History Textbook Reform, despite noting that the textbook which the Society had authored "was colored more strongly by nationalism than others".

In 2007 Hata was vocal in his denunciation of an essay written by Toshio Tamogami, a former general in the Japanese Air Self-Defense Force, which sought to justify Japanese imperialism. Hata found Tamogami's essay to be "of extremely low quality" and full of "old conspiracy theories". Because of his scholarship on the Nanjing Massacre, Hata has been attacked by Nanjing Massacre deniers such as Masaaki Tanaka, who said that Hata was infected with "IMTFE syndrome", and Shōichi Watanabe.

In 1990 Hata argued that the recently released monologue of Emperor Hirohito, the former Emperor's recollection of wartime Japan which he recorded shortly after World War II, had likely been created to prove to the United States that he was not involved in war crimes and consequently Hata theorized that an English language translation must have also been drawn up at the same time, a theory which was mocked by right-wing scholars who felt the monologue was created as a simple historical record without ulterior motives. In 1997 the English language draft was discovered.

== Personal life ==
Hata has been married to Kazuko Matsumura since 9 September 1973 and has one daughter, Mineko. He lives in Meguro in Tokyo, Japan.

== Awards ==
- 1993 – Kikuchi Kan Prize
- 2014 – Mainichi Publishing Cultural Awards

== Works in English ==
=== Books ===
- Reality and Illusion: The Hidden Crisis between Japan and the USSR 1932–1934. New York: Columbia University Press, 1967.
- With Yasuho Izawa. Japanese Naval Aces and Fighter Units in World War II. Annapolis: Naval Institute Press, 1989.
- With Yasuho Izawa and Christopher Shores. Japanese Army Air Force Fighter Units and Their Aces 1931-1945. London: Grub Street, 2002.
- Hirohito: The Showa Emperor in War and Peace. Honolulu: University of Hawaii Press, 2007.
- Hata, Ikuhiko (2018). Comfort Women and Sex in the Battle Zone. Hamilton Books. ISBN 978-0761870333.
  - Book review: Dreyer, June Teufel (19 September 2018). "[BOOK REVIEW] 'Comfort Women and Sex in the Battle Zone' by Ikuhiko Hata". Japan Forward.

=== Chapters of books ===
- "Japanese Historical Writing on the Origins of the Pacific War" (in Papers on Modern Japan. Canberra: Australian National University Press, 1968.)
- "The Battle of Midway" (in Purnell's History of the 20th Century Volume Seven. New York: Purnell, 1971.)
- "The Japanese-Soviet Confrontation, 1935-1939" (in Deterrent Diplomacy: Japan, Germany, and the USSR 1935–1940. New York: Columbia University Press, 1976.)
- "The Army's Move into Northern Indochina" (in The Fateful Choice: Japan's Advance into Southeast Asia, 1939–1941. New York: Columbia University Press, 1980.)
- "The Occupation of Japan, 1945–1952" (in The American Military and the Far East: Proceedings of the Ninth Military History Symposium. Washington DC: Government Printing Office, 1980.)
- "From Mukden to Pearl Harbor" (in Japan Examined: Perspectives on Modern Japanese History. Honolulu: University of Hawaii Press, 1983.)
- "The Marco Polo Bridge Incident 1937" (in The China Quagmire. New York: Columbia University Press, 1983.)
- "Continental Expansion 1905–1941" (in The Cambridge History of Japan Volume Six. London: Cambridge University Press, 1988.)
- "The Road to the Pacific War" (in Pearl Harbor Reexamined. Honolulu: University of Hawaii Press, 1990.)
- "Admiral Yamamoto's Surprise Attack and the Japanese Navy's War Strategy" (in From Pearl Harbor to Hiroshima. London: Macmillan, 1994.)
- "From Consideration to Contempt: The Changing Nature of Japanese Military and Popular Perceptions of Prisoners of War Through the Ages" (in Prisoners of War and Their Captors in World War II. Oxford: Berg, 1996.)
- "The Flawed UN Report on Comfort Women" (in Women and Women's Issues in Post World War II Japan. New York: Garland, 1998.)
- "Nanjing, construction of a 'great massacre'" (in An Overview of the Nanjing Debate. Tokyo: Japan Echo, 2008.)
- "Nanking atrocities, fact and fable" (in An Overview of the Nanjing Debate. Tokyo: Japan Echo, 2008.)

=== Articles ===
- "A Japanese View of the Pacific War", Orient/West, July 1962.
- "Japan Under the Occupation", The Japan Interpreter, Winter 1976.
- "The Postwar Period in Retrospect", Japan Echo, 1984.
- "When Ideologues Rewrite History", Japan Echo, Winter 1986.
- "Going to War: Who Delayed the Final Note?", Journal of American-East Asian Relations, Fall 1994.
