= Masaaki Tanaka =

Japanese writer (1911–2006)

- 田中 正明
- Born: February 11, 1911
- Died: January 8, 2006 (aged 94)
- Notable work: What Really Happened in Nanking: The Refutation of a Common Myth

Masaaki Tanaka (田中 正明, Tanaka Masaaki) (February 11, 1911 – January 8, 2006) was a Japanese author notable for his book What Really Happened in Nanking: The Refutation of a Common Myth, which denies that the Nanjing Massacre as traditionally understood took place. Originally written in Japanese in 1987, an English version was published in 2000 in response to Iris Chang's book, The Rape of Nanking.

== Document Tampering Controversy ==
A Japanese World War II veteran, Tanaka served as General Iwane Matsui's secretary at the time of Nanjing Massacre in 1937 during the Second Sino-Japanese War. He was involved in a controversy in 1986 when he was found to have altered a key historical document, Matsui Iwane Taishō no jinchū nikki (松井石根大将の陣中日記; "General Matsui Iwane's Battlefield Diary"), in several hundred places when serving as the editor for its publication in 1985. He suffered academic ostracism after the controversy but remained an active author for the non-academic market.
