= Tokushi Kasahara =

Japanese historian (born 1944)

Tokushi Kasahara (笠原 十九司, Kasahara Tokushi; born 1944) is a Japanese historian. He is a professor emeritus at Tsuru University and his area of expertise is modern Chinese history.

== Life and career ==
He was born in Gunma Prefecture and graduated from Gunma Prefectural Maebashi High School and the department of humanities at Tokyo University of Education. He started a master's degree at the same university but did not complete it. After serving as a teacher in the faculty of education of Utsunomiya University, he has worked regularly since 1999 at the Nanjing Massacre Research Center of Nanjing Normal University as a visiting professor and, since 2000, in the same capacity in the department of history at Nankai University.

He is a researcher on the Nanjing Massacre that occurred in the early stages of the Second Sino-Japanese War. Although he acknowledges that the death toll for the massacre of over 300,000 used by Nanjing Massacre Memorial Hall is a baseless overestimate, he takes the position that "between more than 100,000 and about 200,000" were massacred not only in the city but also in the surrounding areas and six neighbouring counties though "there is a possibility this number will continue to increase based on future discoveries and disclosures of data and the future course of research." Originally the modern economic history of China was his area of expertise, but in the middle of the 1980s he began research into the Nanjing Massacre and upon involving himself in the debate on how Japanese perceive their history his research on military history became dominant. Currently he is participating as a Japanese representative at an international textbook conference that is sponsored by a Korean-based foundation of northeast Asian history and the Peace Boat.

== Apology over misused photograph ==
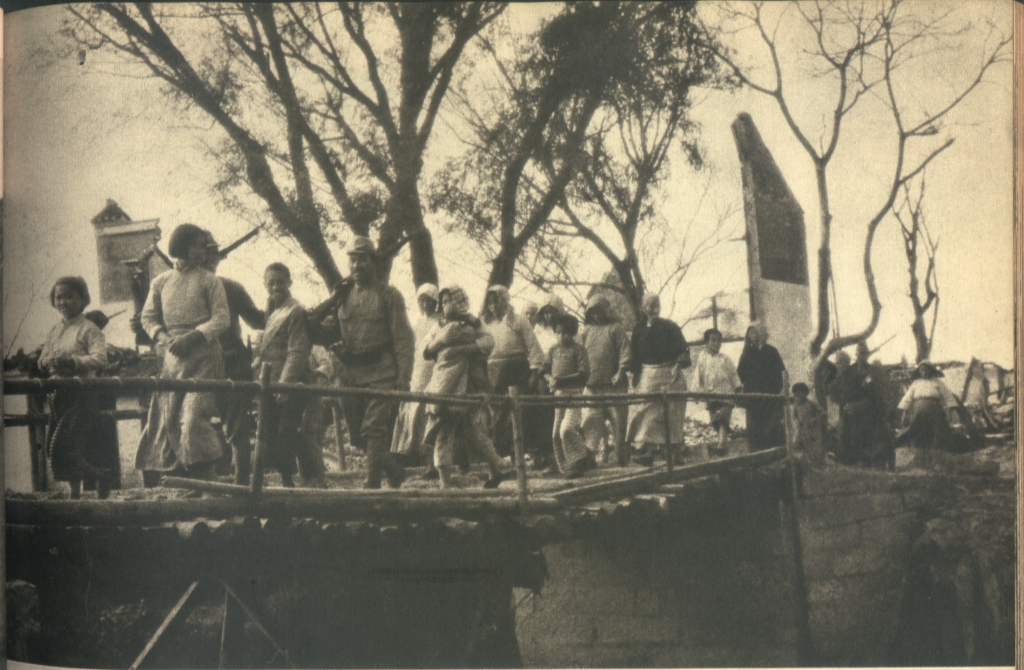
The photograph in question

On the first page of chapter 3 of his 1997 book Nankin Jiken ("The Nanjing Incident"), Kasahara published a photograph with the caption "Chinese women from the Jiangnan region who are being abducted by the Japanese army" from a 1938 copy of the Riguan Baohang Shilu, a publication of the Politburo of the Military Committee of the ROC, that he had seen at the Hoover Institution's East Asia Collection at Stanford University. However, it was pointed out by Ikuhiko Hata that the photograph was originally published in the Asahi Graph on 10 November 1937 and actually said it was "a group of girls of the 'Rising Sun' village who are returning to the village from farm work with the assistance of our troops".

Kasahara personally apologized for not noticing that this picture taken by an Asahi Shimbun photographer had been misused by the Riguan Baohang Shilu. Accepting this, his publisher Iwanami Shoten temporarily ceased putting the book in exhibits and published on the same page a written apology entitled "to all readers." With Kasahara's consent they swapped it with a photo from the book Morase Moriyasu Shashinshū: Watashi no Jūgun Chūgoku Sensen ("The Collected Photographs of Moriyasu Morase: My Service on the Front Line in China") of an old woman who says that she was raped by Japanese soldiers, and they agreed to replacements of the first edition.

== Works ==
=== Sole author ===
- 『ファミリー版 世界と日本の歴史（9）現代1』（大月書店, 1988年）
- 『アジアの中の日本軍――戦争責任と歴史学・歴史教育』（大月書店, 1994年）
- 『南京難民区の百日――虐殺を見た外国人』（岩波書店, 1995年/岩波現代文庫, 2005年）
- 『日中全面戦争と海軍――パナイ号事件の真相』（青木書店, 1997年）
- 『南京事件』（岩波書店[岩波新書], 1997年）
- 『南京事件と三光作戦―未来に生かす戦争の記憶』（大月書店, 1999年）
- 『南京事件と日本人――戦争の記憶をめぐるナショナリズムとグローバリズム』（柏書房, 2002年）
- 『同時代 笠原十九司歌集』（本阿弥書店, 2003年）
- 『体験者27人が語る南京事件――虐殺の「その時」とその後の人生』（高文研, 2006年）
- 『南京事件論争史—日本人は史実をどう認識してきたか』（平凡社新書, 2007年）
- 『「百人斬り競争」と南京事件』（大月書店, 2008年）
- 『日中戦争全史（上・下）』（高文研, 2017年）

=== As an editor ===
- （鈴木亮）『写真記録日中戦争（全6巻）』 （ほるぷ出版, 1995年）
- 『歴史の事実をどう認定しどう教えるか：検証731部隊・南京虐殺事件・「従軍慰安婦」』（教育史料出版会, 1997年）
- 『「中国人20万人大虐殺」を否定したがる論者へ！』(小学館「SAPIO」、1998年12月23日号)
- 『南京大虐殺否定論13のウソ』（南京事件調査研究会,柏書房, 1999年）著者は井上久士、小野賢二、笠原十九司、藤原彰、本多勝一、吉田裕、渡辺春巳
- （吉田裕）『現代歴史学と南京事件』（柏書房, 2006年）
