= Tomio Hora =

Japanese historian (1932-2000)

- 洞 富雄
- Born: November 14, 1906; Higashichikuma District, Nagano, Japan
- Died: March 15, 2000 (aged 93)
- Occupation: Historian

Tomio Hora (Japanese: 洞 富雄, Hepburn: Hora Tomio; 14 November 1906 – 15 March 2000) was a Japanese historian and Waseda University professor, well known for his pioneering efforts to push back against Nanjing Massacre denial inside Japan.

== Education ==
Hora attended junior high school at Matsumoto Kukashi High School (長野県松本深志高等学校) and high school at Waseda University High School.

He was a graduate of Waseda University's literature department. He received his Doctor of Letters from Waseda.

== Nanjing Massacre ==
In 1972, Hora published his seminal Nankin Jiken, in which he refuted revisionist denial of the Nanjing Massacre. The work updated his 1967 Kindai senshi no nazo ("Riddles of Modern War History"). This detailed treatment of the incident was a meaningful, in-depth response to revisionist accounts of Imperial Japanese action in China.

Hora's Nankin Jiken appeared amidst controversy in regards to the Nanjing Massacre scholarship of Honda Katsuichi, whose Chugoku no tabi ("Travels in China") recorded Chinese eyewitness accounts of Japanese wartime atrocities. Honda's account garnered much support and stimulated debate in Japan, while at the same time attracting fearsome nationalistic defenses of Japanese military activity in the period, which materialized as historical debates, rhetorical attacks, and personal threats. Hora's Nankin Jiken then appeared, which bolstered Honda's interview-based research with a documentary record, answering various attempts to undercut the Nanjing Massacre in Japanese historiography.

Throughout the 1970s, Hora continued his struggle against revisionist works, publishing a number of scholarly monographs and documents on the events of the war. In 1984, he became a founding member of the Study Group on the Nanjing Incident, a diverse group of scholars, lawyers, and teachers, who held a variety of views but agreed that "they had to face the past wrongs committed by Japan". The organization's stated goal was the advancement of historical consciousness in Japan, in order to construct a "fortress for peace".
