= Netto-uyoku =

Japanese ultranationalist alt-right netizens

Netto-uyoku or net uyoku (ネット右翼, lit. 'Internet rightists'), often shortened to neto-uyo (ネトウヨ), is a term used to refer to Japanese people who espouse ultranationalist and far-right views online. It shares similarities with right-wing populist and alt-right ideologies found in the West, and is considered a precursor to the latter.

== Origins ==
The fallout of the Lost Decades led to significant socioeconomic changes from the bubble asset led to general distrust and decline of national morale within Japanese society. (Note: Major incidents during the 1990s, such as the Tokyo subway sarin attack and the Great Hanshin Earthquake were also contributing factors in de-motivating general Japanese society.) Nationalism became more prominent in the early 2000s when North Korea officially admitted to abducting Japanese citizens and the introduction of the Korean Wave in Japan. In an attempt to lash out from the constant frustration, social anxiety, and distrust on national coverages from the mainstream media, netizens displaced their xenophobic and ultranationalistic attitudes through online bulletin boards and forums.

According to journalist Go Watanabe, the term refers to people who express extreme views like xenophobia on the internet. Sociologist Daisuke Tsuji states that while there is no strict definition, the term generally refers to users who make conservative and xenophobic posts or disseminate information, and that some distinguish between "Netto-Koshi" (Net conservatives) and "Netto-Uyo," particularly when the xenophobic tendencies are less pronounced. Koichi Yasuda remarks that people who promote "patriotism", "anti-Korean," "anti-China," and "anti-leftist" views through online forums are generally referred to as Netto-Uyo.

While the term is often used with negative connotations, Hiroyuki Seto actively identifies as a "Netto-Uyo", and activist Makoto Sakurai has used it as the title of his book. Similarly, Kobe City Council member Yuji Okada has stated, "I am a Netto-Uyo. I take pride in being a Netto-Uyo. I'm not particularly right-wing or left-wing, nor do I call myself a conservative. I'm just a Netto-Uyo". Thus, some individuals embrace the term "Netto-Uyo" themselves, and its interpretation varies widely.

According to Daisuke Tsuji, the term "Netto-Uyo" spread as an internet slang around the year 2000, and according to Masaki Ito, the terms "Netto-Uyo" or "Netto-Uyo" became widely used in the mid-2000s. Additionally, Masami Shiba states that the phenomenon of "Netto-Uyo" emerged in the early 2000s, around the same time that internet communication through anonymous message boards like 2channel began to spread. Furthermore, Kunio Suzuki notes that the term "Netto-Uyo" had become common by at least the 2000s.

According to Toshinao Sasaki, when people with left-wing or anti-Japanese views make statements on internet message boards or blogs, they often face a storm of critical comments. Left-wing individuals, frustrated by this, began to protest, claiming that organized Netto-Uyo groups were carrying out coordinated disruptive actions. This is considered the origin of the term. In an Asahi Shimbun article titled "The Structure of Shrinking," it is noted that the term "Netto-Uyo" had been used on the internet for several years, referring to people who repeatedly post or comment on ideas that oppose their own. Since most of these opinions are based on right-wing ideologies, they came to be called "Netto-Uyo".

Yoshihiko Inagaki listed "Netto-Uyo" in the "Word Watch" section of Contemporary Words and Basic Knowledge 2011.

The earliest confirmed use of the term "Netto-Uyo" dates back to April 29, 1999, in a post introducing the newly formed Netto-Uyo group Tetsusenkai, which is slightly earlier than the establishment of 2channel (now 5channel).

== Views ==
The netto-uyoku have viewpoints that are emboldened via interacting with other people who share the same perspective.

They generally express support for historically negationist views that portray the former Empire of Japan in a positive light and denies or minimizes Japanese war crimes during World War II, while maintaining negative sentiments towards countries that have diplomatic tensions with Japan, specifically North and South Korea, China (anti-Chinese sentiment), Russia and sometimes the United States of America. Netto-uyoku express hostility towards the local immigrants and ethnic minorities associated with those countries, and also promote patriotism within Japanese schools by advocating the requirement for students to sing the national anthem before class.

Domestically, the netto-uyoku express criticisms against the left-wing parties (Japanese Communist Party and Social Democratic Party) and the Japanese mainstream media, which they accuse of having a liberal bias.

=== Views on Net Right-Wing ===
Naoshi Kōgami describes the Net Right-Wing as seeking to maintain or restore the "good old Japan". Kōgami's idea of "good old Japan" refers not to militarism but to the communal ties that existed before the dissolution of traditional local communities.

According to Kei Horiya, the Net Right-Wing not only opposes left-wing media (liberal media) but frequently uses terms like "awakening". In this view, they believe that they were once "brainwashed" by the media, accepting a "false historical perspective", but eventually "woke up" to the "truth". This perspective mirrors the storyline of protagonists "awakening" from a "deceptive" world and fighting a "true enemy", much like in the sci-fi movie The Matrix. Horiya calls this worldview the "Matrix History". Furthermore, Horiya argues that the Net Right-Wing is damaging Japanese businesses and the economy as a whole.

Tomofumi Hamano views the rise of the Net Right-Wing as a consequence of the failure of leftist ideologies to resolve societal dissatisfaction after the Cold War.

Mitsuru Kurayama and Terumi Yoshida define those who defame figures like Emperor Emeritus Akihito as Net Right-Wing, considering such actions as insults rather than critiques.

A person arrested for sending abusive messages to Princess Mako (now Mako Komuro) expressed strong sympathies with the Zaitokukai and attacked the Asahi Shimbun over the comfort women issue. Investigators labeled this individual as a "typical Net Right-Wing".

Kurayama argues that historically, individuals who identify as conservative or right-wing never defamed the imperial family in this manner, and thus, the Net Right-Wing has faced criticism from traditional conservative factions.

Ichirō Yamamoto attributes the rise of Net Right-Wing individuals to those who feel inferior about their career, academic background, or family and instead take pride in their nationality or being Japanese. He compares them to those involved in Japan's Meiji Restoration's anti-foreign movements.

=== Zaitokukai and the Net Right-Wing ===
Kōichi Yasuda describes the Zaitokukai (Citizens' Group Against Special Rights for Foreigners) as the "street version of the Net Right-Wing" and asserts that the Zaitokukai would not exist without the "resource" of the Net Right-Wing. Akira Fujio explains that the Zaitokukai is known for organizing demonstrations and meetings where online Net Right-Wing individuals, prompted by posts on internet forums, gather to participate.

Takahiro Mitsuhashi and Kei Horiya argue that Zaitokukai should not be considered Net Right-Wing but rather "Real Right-Wing".

== Statistics ==
Japanese critic and writer Tsunehira Furuya describes the netto uyoku as a "new breed of neo-nationalists who interact almost entirely within their own cyber community, shut off from the rest of society". According to Furuya, "the average age of Japan's Internet right-wingers is around 40. Some 75% of them are male", and adds that although active on the web, they lack institutional political representation offline. This leads them to be more active online, in order to back the far-right elements of the ruling Liberal Democratic Party, especially those under the administration of former Prime Minister Shinzo Abe.

=== Daisuke Tsuji's study on right-wing shift ===
Daisuke Tsuji, in a 2007 survey of internet users aged 20–44, identified those who met the following three conditions as part of the "net right-wing" group: (1) Responding with "not very" or "not at all" when asked about their affinity for either South Korea or China, (2) Responding with "agree" or "somewhat agree" to all five items: "official visits to the Yasukuni Shrine by the Prime Minister or Ministers," "amendment of Article 9, Section 1 of the Constitution," "amendment of Article 9, Section 2 of the Constitution," "raising the national flag and singing the national anthem at elementary and junior high school ceremonies", and "patriotism education in elementary and junior high schools", (3) Responding affirmatively to at least one of the following three items: "I have written my opinions or thoughts on my own homepage about political or social issues," "I have commented on someone else's blog about political or social issues," or "I have participated in debates on electronic bulletin boards or mailing lists." These individuals were estimated to make up less than 1% of the entire internet user population.

According to a survey of 998 internet users conducted by Tsuji, he found that "use of 2chan, in particular, is associated with exclusionary nationalism, and using 2chan is significantly linked to a tolerant attitude toward malicious comments and online outrage". He also defined the so-called "net right-wing" as those who actively use blogs and electronic bulletin boards to share information and who fit all three of the following criteria: "feel no affinity for either 'South Korea' or 'China'," "agree with official visits to Yasukuni Shrine, constitutional amendments, etc.," and "engage in writing or debates about political and social issues online". His study revealed that this group tends to be active in "real" activities like petitions, letters to the editor, fundraising, and attending rallies. Tsuji concludes that "the 'net right-wing' is not just an internet phenomenon but is connected to 'real' world activities, and it may be more appropriate to view this as the emergence of latent 'right-wing' elements on the internet, which had been less visible before".

Moreover, Tsuji notes that the general "right-wing" tendencies, such as patriotism and nationalist sentiment, do not necessarily correlate with anti-Korean or anti-Chinese attitudes. Factors such as national pride, political or cultural pride, and patriotism are positively correlated with greater affinity for South Korea and China, as well as more positive evaluations of immigrants. These factors also correlate with greater trust in others, more friends, and lower feelings of loneliness. In contrast to general "right-wing" tendencies, the net right-wing group exhibits characteristics such as fewer neighbors with whom they interact, less trust in others, more loneliness in interpersonal relationships, and a stronger sense of exclusion towards outsiders, particularly South Korea and China, as well as a negative view of immigrants (the stronger the sense of loneliness, the stronger the exclusionary attitude, with a stronger correlation to anti-Korean sentiment than anti-Chinese sentiment). Tsuji concludes that the net right-wing group occupies a distinct position within the broader correlation structure of "right-wing" factors, and it is difficult to consider them as representative of general "right-wing" tendencies. Instead, he notes that patriotism and anti-Korean/anti-Chinese sentiment are often integrated within this group. In his survey, 36.8% felt no affinity for either South Korea or China, 6.4% supported official visits to Yasukuni Shrine and constitutional amendments, and 15.2% had engaged in online writing or debates about political or social issues. The net right-wing group, meeting all three criteria, represented 1.3%. Given that the sample included many heavy internet users, Tsuji estimated that the percentage in the general internet user population was below 1%.

=== Kikuko Nagayoshi's analysis ===
Kikuko Nagayoshi used data from a "Public Opinion Survey on Citizens' Political Participation" conducted in December 2017 to analyze the factors that contribute to becoming a net right-winger, considering social attributes, socioeconomic status, social isolation, political and social awareness, and media usage.

Regarding social attributes, net right-wingers tend to favor the Liberal Democratic Party (LDP) and former Prime Minister Abe, identifying as conservatives. Historically, net right-wingers have been thought to be young males, particularly those from socioeconomically weaker backgrounds, but the data from the survey showed that while men were more likely than women to be net right-wingers, age did not correlate strongly with this tendency.

In terms of socioeconomic status, net right-wingers were less likely to be in non-regular employment, with higher rates among business owners, self-employed individuals, and regular employees. The analysis of the survey data revealed that having a spouse or someone to confide in was statistically related to a lower likelihood of becoming a net right-winger, although the connection was weak, and there was no clear difference in the proportion of net right-wingers between groups with or without a spouse or confidant.

In terms of political and social consciousness, net right-wingers tended to have higher levels of political efficacy, authoritarian attitudes, and traditional family values.

Regarding media usage, net right-wingers are less likely to use television as a source of information about political and social issues, tending instead to rely on the internet, indicating an anti-TV and pro-internet stance. Moreover, those who primarily use the internet, books, magazines, and information from organizations as sources of political and social information were more likely to become net right-wingers, whereas those who primarily used television were less likely to align with this group.

=== Naoto Higuchi's analysis of Facebook users ===
Naoto Higuchi conducted a study on Facebook users to uncover the backgrounds that lead to net right-wing "activities" in their respective life worlds.

The survey targeted Facebook users who posted critical comments regarding the December 28, 2015, Japan-South Korea agreement on the "comfort women" issue following a year-end greeting posted by Prime Minister Abe on Facebook. These individuals were studied as part of the net right-wing group. Higuchi analyzed publicly available attribute information and user pages, compiling the results in tables.

Facebook users tend to be older compared to other social networks, with the majority of the survey participants in their 30s to 50s. Of the 735 users surveyed, 289 had their occupation revealed, and among them, 137 were business owners or self-employed.

Higuchi then categorized net right-wingers into five types—"Real-chu Netoyu," "Lifestyle Netoyu," "Stealth Netoyu," "True Netoyu," and "Hidden Netoyu"—based on their attitudes towards their online political activities.

== Opinions ==
=== Group polarization phenomenon ===
According to Mitsuru Fukuda (Political science scholar. Born in 1969 in Hyogo Prefecture.) Professor at the Faculty of Crisis Management, Nihon University. The faculty is also found at Chiba Institute of Science and Kurashiki University of Science and the Arts, in media studies, the idea that "online public opinion tends to become more extreme" is common. With the massification of the Internet, increasing equality and anonymity, and greater freedom of expression, decision-making tends to polarize (become more extreme), which can be explained by the group polarization phenomenon model (group polarization). Fukuda also points out that the reason why online polarization often leans toward the right, rather than the left, is that "in Japan, nationalism and patriotism became taboo under postwar democracy, and a long period followed where free speech was suppressed. Furthermore, mass media were institutionalized with a left-wing, human-rights focus, making criticism of China and East Asia taboo, and even words like 'emergency' or 'crisis management' became hesitated to use. In this closed discourse space created by postwar media, voices that were suppressed but wanted to speak out have emerged since the widespread use of the internet in 1995".

According to Daisuke Tsuji, the "Net Right" phenomenon, involving extremely nationalistic or racist and xenophobic statements, might be related to Cass Sunstein's concept of cyber-cascade proposed in his book Is the Internet a Threat to Democracy?. (Note: For more on cyber-cascade, see Cass Sunstein's Is the Internet a Threat to Democracy?, translated by Yukinori Ishikawa, Mainichi Newspapers, November 30, 2003, ISBN 4-620-31660-1, pp. 67–101, Chapter 3: "Division and Cyber-Cascades".)

According to Tatsuo Tanaka and Toshinori Hama, people who make extreme claims like "Netouyo" or "Payoku" (derogatory terms for extreme right-wing or left-wing internet users) tend to dominate online spaces. They observe that discussions for mutual understanding are rare, and society seems divided into two opposing groups with ongoing futile arguments, rejecting dialogue. They conducted large-scale surveys to examine whether the internet leads to the radicalization of opinions and social polarization. Their findings suggest that internet or SNS platforms are not conducive to meaningful discussions, often leading to insults and counterattacks. As a result, these platforms appear to foster polarization. However, they conclude that internet use doesn't cause polarization directly. Instead, it is people who were already polarized who tend to use these platforms, thus reinforcing pre-existing divides, that the internet itself does not divide society, but rather calms people down, and that it is not the use of internet media that causes polarization, but rather that already polarized individuals are more likely to use such platforms.

=== Comparison with right-wing and conservative movements ===
Kōichi Katō notes, "I feel that this is a different aspect compared to traditional nationalist right-wing movements. We have been cut off from connections with our families, communities, and workplaces, and have become like balloons without strings. In such a state, it is no surprise that people who are susceptible to extreme nationalism, which stirs up conflicts with neighboring countries, might emerge."

Yoshinori Kobayashi has been called the creator of the "Netouyo" after the surge of these individuals following the publication of his book *Theories of War*, but he personally dislikes "Netouyo." He has also said that "those who misread 'Theories of War' become Netouyo".

He further stated, "In the past, most young people were left-wing, but now it seems like they have shifted to conservatism or something like 'Netouyo' after 'Theories of War'. But now, in a sense, there are many people who feel that by invoking the concept of the nation, they can elevate their self-consciousness."

Yoshiko Sakurai warns, "If people simply shout things like 'Go back to the Peninsula,' that is not 'patriotism' nor 'conservatism.' If one falls into narrow nationalism or chauvinism, it will certainly lead to isolation in the international community and the wrong path. I hope that those called Netouyo do not make such mistakes." She also said, "I hope those called Netouyo, who are angry with the current situation, study history and become true conservatives who will help Japan revive."

Takeshi Nakajima suggests that some might not even be committed to conservative thought but are simply "anti-leftist", reacting negatively to what the left says. Makai Nishibe points out that "Netouyo" exhibits a kind of anti-intellectualism, characterized by vulgar language, slander, and baseless opinions, similar to the rhetoric of left-wing speakers. He concludes that it is a prejudice from the Asahi Shimbun to claim that only right-wing individuals exhibit anti-intellectualism.

Kei Hara in a dialogue with Tsunenori Uno argues, "Netouyo is not conservative".

Hiroyuki Nishimura argues that Netouyo individuals are simply "low-intelligence, idle poor people", adding that they are quick to criticize China and South Korea because they still think Japan can win, but they never criticize America because they believe Japan cannot defeat the US. He says, "They are sad people who only confront weaker opponents." He also notes that Netouyo never discuss or participate in debates, calling their behavior on internet forums as "shouting only".

=== Views of traditional right-wing movements ===
Hiroshi Kawahara (Ethno-nationalist right-wing. Born in 1970 in Fujisawa, Kanagawa Prefecture.) President of the Dōketsu-sha argues, "They often focus on the 'special privileges' of foreign nationals in Japan, tend to lean towards xenophobia, and use racist language. However, to view a particular ethnic group as inferior and claim that one's own nation is superior is no different from the ethnocentrism seen in Sinocentrism, which they dislike. Japanese patriotism is something much purer, nurtured by a long history under the Emperor." He further claims, "If Japan were to have a military now, it could easily cause trouble for neighboring countries, similar to how the Net Right bullies foreign nationals in Japan".

Munetoku Kaneko states, "Even Netouyo and Abe supporters are different from us. Frankly, I find them 'lightweight'. They are active based on a simple narrative that 'the bad left-wingers have dirtied the wonderful Japanese nation,' without any fundamental sense of unease about the society in which they were born and raised. I can't understand why they are so positive about the current state of affairs and why they blame only the left-wing for all the problems."

Masahiro Ninagawa comments on Netouyo, "I don't rate them at all. I dislike anonymous speakers, whether right-wing or left-wing. Taking responsibility for one's words is the minimum level of decency. Sitting comfortably in a kotatsu (heated table) while throwing out extreme language is not the behavior of a man. For example, denying a person's nationality or targeting the Korean ethnic group is meaningless. Throwing stones at individuals is cowardly."

Yoshinori Kobayashi criticizes Netouyo, stating, "When Yoshinori Kobayashi holds a free Niconico Live stream, Netouyo, Baka Uyo (foolish right-wingers), and NEET Uyo invade, filling the screen with curses." He also said, "Netouyo are like the Red Guards of Shinzo Abe!" Regarding Shinzo Abe, he adds, "The Netouyo, who support Abe, are like a bunch of weaklings who can only fight with the backing of this Netouyo group." He also harshly criticizes the magazine Japanism, which is said to be favored by Netouyo, calling it a "magazine that supports the anti-Korean group Zaitokukai and is a hardcore right-wing publication promoting nuclear power." He adds, "The readers of this magazine are those who support Zaitokukai and those who enjoy discriminating against Koreans." In this context, he criticizes Netouyo's hatred toward Koreans, stating, "'Koreans should die! Go home, you Chon!'—these hate speeches are violence, no different from hitting, kicking, or stabbing."

=== Relationship with conservative forums ===
Tsunehira Furuya wrote for conservative magazines such as WiLL (WAC), Voice (PHP Institute), and Seiron (Sangyo Keizai Shinbunsha) during the Net Right era. He became a "mid-level" figure in the "conservative village". However, in a hierarchical society, after he wrote critically about the conservative faction, senior individuals complained, and he was swiftly expelled.

According to Takao Saito, Shokun!—a journal created by Bungei Shunju aimed at being a healthy conservative forum—became a magazine that fiercely insulted anyone who didn't blindly submit to the Koizumi administration, calling them enemies and "leftists" during the 2000s. As a result, circulation increased, but it transformed into a "Netouyo" magazine. This led to dissatisfaction both inside and outside the company. In spring 2007, the editor-in-chief was replaced, but circulation continued to decline, and the magazine ceased publication with the June 2009 issue. Furthermore, the magazines Gendai (Kodansha) and G2 did not become "Netouyo" publications and were discontinued. Even Shincho 45 (Shinchosha) became a "Netouyo" publication, and anger about this transformation led to a larger conflict.

=== Comparison with leftists and liberals ===
According to Kazutomo Goto, some liberals attribute the rise of the Net Right phenomenon to people pushed into lower social strata due to neoliberal economic policies. However, among those making these claims, very few advocate for "relief" through labor economics policies or reconsideration of new labor ethics for the new era. Additionally, Net Leftists often engage in baseless "analyses" of Netouyo, labeling them as "immature", "NEET," "virgins", and "otaku", while also distributing banners criticizing figures like Junichiro Koizumi and Shinzo Abe, or participating in "festivals"—showing behaviors almost identical to those of the Net Right.

=== Social stratification ===
==== Net right as the "underclass" theory ====
Ruman Kondo (Author. Born in 1962.) argued that the "Net Right" consists of individuals from the "loser" groups such as freeters, contract workers, NEETs, and hikikomori—people who are "managing to live normally but have no future prospects" ("on the verge of losing"). Additionally, Yoshinori Kobayashi considered the Net Right to be "lower-class individuals earning less than 2 million yen annually." Shinji Miyadai claimed that many Net Right adherents are virgins. Koichi Yasuda stated that the Net Right was positioned as a "deformed form of otaku", and their repeated use of discriminatory language online has led to them being ridiculed as "aggressive hikikomori". Martin Fackler reported in The New York Times on August 29, 2010, that the "Net Right" and groups like the Citizens' Association Against Special Privileges for Foreigners were emerging actions from Japan's lower and middle classes (poor youth), disillusioned with their own lives and expressing their feelings of despair through online exclusion of foreigners. He also noted that these individuals targeted not only Asians but also Christians.

==== Argument for ordinary people ====
Daisuke Tsuda argued that the individuals labeled "Net Right" come from various backgrounds, ranging from those linked to right-wing groups to ordinary citizens. This group includes people who are dissatisfied with anti-Japanese sentiments from China and Korea, as well as those rebelling against left-wing elitism. Tsuda stated that these individuals connect over the internet, and in recent years, have begun meeting offline, such as in protests like the Fuji TV demonstrations.

==== Tsunehira Furuya's theory and the real number of net right adherents ====
Tsunehira Furuya defines Net Right followers not as those who repeatedly make right-wing comments online, but as "individuals who uncritically parasitize conservative opinions".

Furuya refuted the claim by Yoshinori Kobayashi that "Net Right" adherents are not poor but are rather high-income earners. He argued that this belief, which suggests that wealthy individuals couldn't be foolish enough to support right-wing views, was an erroneous stereotype. Furuya added that the misconception that "high-income earners and highly educated individuals make common-sense decisions" has no basis in reality, pointing out that wealthy individuals are sometimes victims of financial fraud and deception. According to a 2013 survey by Furuya, the average income of Net Right adherents is approximately 4.5 million yen, about the same as the national average for Japanese citizens. The survey found that 60% of them were university graduates (including dropouts), their average age was slightly over 38 years old, and the gender ratio was about 3:1, with two-thirds living in the greater Tokyo and Kanagawa areas. The most common profession among them was self-employed, and many were middle or upper-level managers. Furthermore, Furuya argued that current Net Rightists resemble the "middle-class type 1" supporters of pre-war Japanese fascism as defined by Masao Maruyama, which included small business owners, factory managers, independent farmers, school teachers, and lower-level public servants.

==== Existence of elite rightists ====
Psychiatrist Naoko Nakatsuka a.k.a. Rika Kayama, who viewed Net Rightists as "poor young people from a stratified society", acknowledged Furuya's analysis that many Net Right adherents are from the middle class in major cities. She also noted the possible existence of wealthier right-wing individuals, such as those in multinational corporations or medical professionals, who align with the "nationalism-neoliberalism" spectrum. She argued that they are part of the "elite rightists" (エリウヨ), a new social group.

=== Allegations regarding associations with specific politicians ===
==== Junichiro Koizumi ====
In September 2006, Jiro Yamaguchi stated about Junichiro Koizumi: "He justified his visit to Yasukuni Shrine by bringing up a 'problem of the heart,' which can be described as an aggressive form of *hikikomori* (social withdrawal). The internet right-wing, following his example, have closed themselves off in their echo chambers, attacking disagreeable opinions. In contrast to the rise of these political figures, the far-right, having lost their prominence, seek more extreme actions, like starting arson incidents".

==== Shinzo Abe ====
According to *Weekly Post* (October 12, 2012), during the 2012 Liberal Democratic Party (LDP) leadership election, internet right-wingers conducted a campaign to defeat Shigeru Ishiba, who was a candidate against Shinzo Abe.

- Tetsuo Suzuki mentioned in his book *Abe Administration's Media Control (2015) that the intense pressure from net right-wingers discouraged TV stations from supporting criticisms of Abe, as any media outlet criticizing him would be flooded with hostile comments, including threats.
- Kei Horie stated that Abe's view of nationalism and patriotism, which stands in contrast to ideas like *pure-bloodism* often associated with certain right-wing ideologies, aligned more with liberal values rather than the extreme right-wing ideas supported by some factions of the internet right.
- Roland Kirishima noted in a conversation with **Soichiro Tahara** that he imagines Abe having a specialized unit to manage the internet right-wing, suggesting that Abe's act of visiting Yasukuni Shrine on December 26, 2013 (Mao Zedong's birthday), was a deliberate gesture to rally his anonymous internet right-wing supporters by aligning with their values.
- Takahiro Miyake discussed how Abe's "strong stance" was supported by net right-wingers but without any actual direct actions from these supporters, noting that they were just "talkers" with no real impact on political affairs.
- Koichi Yasuda pointed out that Abe's strong social media posts, such as his statement on Facebook, "This is a battle against the media. I am fighting alongside you," resonated with net right-wingers' anti-media sentiment.

Jiro Yamaguchi also stated in Tokyo Shimbun (November 23, 2014) that Abe represented the degeneration of the intellect and spirit that typified net right-wing rhetoric. Yamaguchi later reiterated this in Hankyoreh (November 16, 2015), calling the Abe administration's stance on issues like the comfort women controversy as being "polluted by net right-wing views and historical revisionism".

Yoshiaki Arita argued that the rise of hate speech and demonstrations targeting ethnic Koreans was fueled by the influence of the second Abe Cabinet, with the internet right-wing seeing themselves as Abe's allies, fostering further radicalization.

==== Sanae Takaichi ====
Kei Horie discussed how the internet right-wing adheres to a dual narrative of "two types of LDP": the "pro-Japan" faction, represented by Abe and Takaichi, and the "anti-Japan" faction, which they perceive as being represented by figures like Fumio Kishida, Taro Kono, Shigeru Ishiba, and others from the "Keisei-kai" and "Kokei-kai" factions of the LDP.

Taro Akasaka suggested that while internet right-wingers may have been influenced by Abe's support of Takaichi, they misinterpreted the situation, believing that Takaichi would "save Japan," despite Abe's more strategic calculation in supporting her during the leadership contest to bolster his influence within the party.

=== Analysis of internet right-wing activities ===
==== Hideomi Egami ====
According to Hideomi Egami, for many in the internet right-wing, the mainstream media, which is dominated by elites, is considered inherently deceptive and dishonest. Therefore, the relatively pro-nuclear stance of the mainstream media is unacceptable, and a significant portion of the internet right-wing is anti-nuclear. (Note: Tetsuya Miyazaki: "Just because the majority of the left today is leaning towards anti-nuclear power, it should not be assumed that the entire Marxist ideology is against nuclear power generation.) (Note: Yoshinori Kobayashi: "Conservatives are quick to label leftists as "anti-nuclear" and conservatives as "pro-nuclear," but this is proof that they have stopped thinking.")

==== Tatsuya Mori ====
Tatsuya Mori argued that "Hoshusokuho (Conservative News) generally uses publicly available articles as sources, but it changes the headline and uses provocative language to stir up the net right-wing and increase page views".

==== Keiko Furuya ====
According to Keiko Furuya, the rumor that "the daughter of Okinawa Governor Onaga married the son of a Communist Party official after studying in China, and is a Chinese agent," rapidly spread after being tweeted by Toshio Tamogami, but the source of this misinformation was Ryunosuke Kei, a former Maritime Self-Defense Force officer and conservative commentator. Furuya refers to the phenomenon of internet right-wingers jumping on the statements of prominent conservative commentators as "headline (headline) type parasitism". On the other hand, the rumor that "the duo 8.6 Second Buzzker named after the Hiroshima atomic bombing and making light of it" was propagated by net right-wingers, who legitimized it by citing it from respected conservative commentators in retweets, which resulted in the rumor's grassroots spread. Furuya calls this "rumor reinforcement type".

Additionally, regarding the 2022 Russian invasion of Ukraine, Furuya pointed out that some internet right-wingers, incited by figures like former Ukrainian ambassador and Moldova ambassador Mutsuo Mabuchi, and conspiracy theorist Mutsuo Mabuchi, became obsessed with a conspiracy theory, believing that the "Deep State (DS)" that controls the world is manipulating Ukrainian President Volodymyr Zelensky to fight Russia, and that Vladimir Putin is a "warrior of light" standing against the DS. This led them to praise Putin and Russia, which Furuya labeled as a growing trend among net right-wingers.

==== Related to the Lawyer Disciplinary Request Movement ====
In 2017, when around 130,000 disciplinary requests were made against multiple lawyers who were considered to have supported the Tokyo Bar Association's statement from April 2016, "Request for Proper Allocation of Subsidies to Chōsen Schools," Sasaki Ryo tweeted, "The net right-wingers are still the same. About 900 people innocently sending me disciplinary requests, but I'll make sure they get their comeuppance. (^ｰ^)ー☆". (Note: @ssk_ryo (September 2, 2017). "ネット右翼の諸君は相変わらずだなぁ。無邪気に私に懲戒請求してるのも900人くらいるけど、落とし前はつけてもらうからね。(^ｰ^)ー☆" (Tweet) – via Twitter.)

When he filed a lawsuit for damages and found out the age of the opponent, he tweeted, "As for the age of the people who filed the disciplinary requests, the youngest is 43. There is a thick layer of people in their late 40s to 50s, and there are also people in their 60s and 70s. I had been calling them net right-wingers, but since it seems there are many older people, I wonder if that was rude?" (Note: @ssk_ryo (May 18, 2018). "懲戒請求した人の年齢で、今分かってるのは、1番若くて43歳。40代後半から50代が層が厚く、60代、70代もおられる。今までネトウヨ諸君と呼びかけていたけど、年齢的に上の人が多そうなので、失礼だったかな？" (Tweet) – via Twitter.) According to Tatsuo Tanaka and Toshinori Hama, while they had imagined the opponents as aggressive net right-wing youths, they were actually older than themselves, with many of them being close to the age of fathers, which seemed to bewilder them.

Regarding the blog 'Yomei Sannen Jiji Nikki' that called for these disciplinary requests, Keiho Furuya described it as "an old-established net right-wing blog". Blogger and senior researcher at the Information Law Research Institute Ichiro Yamamoto also referred to it as "one of the cult-like net right-wing blogs".

==== 2020 U.S. presidential election ====
Political scientist Chigaya Kinoshita noted that the right-wing online discourse surrounding the 2020 United States presidential election was dominated by the conspiracy theory that "The U.S. election was fraudulent and Trump won." Sociologist Fujio Toriumi's research found that Japan's "Trump won conspiracy" tweets were made by a group of about 580,000 tweets from 100,000 accounts, more than 60% of which were from "conservative accounts" supporting Shinzō Abe. Kinoshita pointed out that while 100,000 accounts represented less than 1% of Japan's Twitter users, right-wing figures with hundreds of thousands of followers, like Naoki Hyakuta, Kaori Arimoto, and Ryusho Kadota, stirred up this conspiracy, creating an echo chamber effect. The individuals and accounts promoting this conspiracy were labeled by Chigaya Kinoshita as "Endgame Netouyo" (extreme net right-wingers), referring to them as "sad conservatives who have crossed a point of no return". These "Endgame Netouyo" began attacking more "common-sense" right-wing figures, such as Tsukasa Jōnen, who accepted Trump's defeat, causing internal strife within the right-wing discourse.

According to Kinoshita, the growth of "Endgame Netouyo" was caused by net right-wingers falling into "Abe loss" after former Prime Minister Abe's resignation, seeking refuge not with successor Prime Minister Yoshihide Suga, but with Trump, who they saw as "one with Abe". Keiho Furuya analyzed that they saw Trump as a "higher upgrade" to Abe's insufficient hardline policies toward China during Abe's second term.

Satoru Ishido analyzed the relationship between net right-wingers and conspiracy theories (particularly those found in QAnon) and stated, "The fear that if Trump isn't president, we won't be able to take a hard stance on 'China,' the anxiety over the change in government, and the fact that Japanese liberal media and intellectuals seemed happy about Trump's departure were significant factors." He continued, "One common sentiment among the current right-wing is 'anti-authoritarianism.' The authority they see is the liberal media, such as the Asahi Shimbun, and intellectuals who contribute to it. When opposition to liberal media and distrust, coupled with the China threat theory, coincided, if there were a convenient claim, people would latch onto it, even if it were an extreme conspiracy theory."

Mitsuru Kurayama noted that, "After the long reign of Shinzō Abe's administration ended, the followers who lost their support turned to U.S. President Donald Trump," adding, "This was exploited by net right-wing comedians. They said, 'There is nothing that suggests Trump will lose!'; 'Reliable sources in American media are reporting Trump's advantage!'; 'In the end, Trump will definitely win!' and so on, offering comforting words and profiting from ignorant and naive net right-wingers. 'Let me tell you some secret information. When U.S. Special Forces stormed and seized servers in Frankfurt, there was a gunfight, resulting in deaths on both the U.S. military and CIA sides. The CIA director was there, injured, captured, and sent to Guantanamo Bay for interrogation, where he is reportedly negotiating.' Though hard to believe, it's shocking that people are willing to pay for such information, and it's even more surprising that professional commentators and journalists spread these stories."

People Who Left the Net Right-Wing Movement Hiroshi Yasuda introduced individuals who left the net right-wing movement after hearing members of the Zaitokukai seriously discussing a rumor posted on an online forum about large numbers of Chinese allegedly moving into the coastline areas devastated by the 2011 Tōhoku earthquake and tsunami. He mentioned that hearing such discussions made them "scared" and led them to leave the movement.

Noritoshi Furuichi noted, "There are cases where people who were involved in the net right-wing scene have properly studied and ended up disliking netouyo. But there's a cycle, as people leave, others join. Overall, while the numbers may have shrunk, the level hasn't changed that much."

=== The term "netouyo" ===
==== Use as a derogatory term ====
On November 24, 2015, the head of the editorial department of the Niigata Nippo tweeted various defamatory remarks directed at a lawyer who served as the representative of the plaintiffs in the third Minamata disease lawsuit. He referred to the lawyer as "a netouyo lawyer" and "a netouyo idol", among other insults. The head of the editorial department later visited the lawyer's office to apologize.

==== Argument that it's a labeling term ====
Tomofumi Hamano expressed surprise at the continued existence of net right-wing phenomena over ten years in the fast-moving online world. He argued that anti-mainstream media or netouyo movements could be seen as a form of citizen-based media surveillance, which could, in some respects, be evaluated positively. However, he added that the practice of labeling people as "right-wing" simply because they disagree with mainstream views was no longer viable.

Makoto Sakurai (also known as Sakurai Makoto) stated that existing media and anti-Japanese forces, who feared the spread of groups like the Citizens Against Special Privileges for Zainichi Koreans and the Actively Engaged Conservative Movement, continued to denounce the movement by using the term "netouyo" and "hate speech", calling it "a label that no longer works in the age of free internet speech", and that the practice of such labeling was childish.

Noritoshi Furuichi argued that both "netouyo" and "conservative" are not terms for social outcasts but are used by middle-class urban dwellers with economic and social stability. He suggested that those labeled as "netouyo" should embrace compassion for social minorities, using it as a defense against such labels. He criticized the inaccurate portrayal of "netouyo" as weak or marginalized.

Sankei Shimbun claimed that the Asahi Shimbun had attempted to discredit the conservative camp by associating them with "netouyo", which, in their view, made conservatives seem unintelligent or foolish.

==== Arguments that it constitutes hate speech ====
Yoshihisa Komori argued that the term "netouyo" is inherently derogatory, carrying a sense of contempt, hatred, or anger from those who use it. He stated that the use of this term clearly labels someone as belonging to the right-wing, and by doing so, it degrades their ideology. He defined the term "netouyo" as a hate speech term that discriminates against individuals or groups based on their ideology, race, religion, gender, or other characteristics.

=== Net left-wing (Net Sayo) ===
Soichiro Matsutani (Writer and researcher born in 1974, from Hiroshima) and (Tomoaki Ichijo) defined the "net left-wing" (Net Sayo) as individuals who, based on unreliable information found online, advocate for causes such as "anti-nuclear" and "election fraud". Like the net right-wing, net sayo pick up information that aligns with their own desires from the internet and use it to support their views. In response to counterarguments, they say, "If you search the internet, you'll find many facts to support it," using the "evidence" that fits their beliefs while refusing to listen to opposing views. The problem, according to Matsutani and Ichijo, is that they only trust the information they want to believe and disregard all opposing opinions. Furthermore, net sayo tend to follow only users who share their views on Twitter, blocking and excluding those who disagree, and seeking solidarity among like-minded individuals who never criticize them. They are also concerned about the number of followers they have while continuing to advocate for anti-nuclear and election fraud theories, with examples of middle-aged men in the net sayo movement given.

Junichiro Nakagawa stated that the internet world has a strong tendency to view issues in terms of a binary good and evil framework, without objectively verifying the truth of the information. He also pointed out that both the net right-wing, which claims that Zainichi Koreans enjoy special privileges to the detriment of Japanese people, and the counter forces that believe it is acceptable to expose personal information if one opposes hate speech, are part of the same "religion" of extreme views.

== Rise of Trumpism ==
The rise of Trumpism among the netto-uyoku community has been observed since September 2020, two months prior to the 2020 United States presidential election. Some Japanese political commentators even theorized that Shinzo Abe's resignation as Prime Minister in September 2020 to be a juncture for netto-uyoku to shift their central figure to Donald Trump as a "political upgrade" in promoting diplomatic policies which embody anti-Chinese sentiment. As such, they began spreading Trump's conspiracy theories in an attempt to overturn the 2020 American presidential election.

== Cultural depictions ==
The social phenomenon of netto-uyoku has been depicted in contemporary Japanese literature. Furuya authored a fictional novel titled Aikokudo (愛国奴, lit. 'Patriot-thrall') in 2018. The plot follows Shoichi Nambu (南部照一), a young man with mild right-wing tendencies who becomes entangled in the internal conflicts and commercialism of the conservative media industry. According to Furuya, the work was originally intended to be published as a non-fiction exposé, but was adapted into a fictionalized narrative incorporating his personal experiences in order to avoid potential defamation lawsuits. The book was later republished in a bunkobon (paperback) edition under the new title Aikoku Shobai (愛国商売, lit. '"Patriotism Business"') in Japan.

== See also ==
- 2channel – Anonymous Japanese textboard
- 50 Cent Party – Chinese government employees making online posts
- 1450 Internet army – Internet posters working for the Democratic Progressive Party
- AK Trolls – Turkish state-sponsored anonymous internet commentators
- Ethnic issues in Japan
- Groypers – Far-right internet group
- Internet Research Agency – Former Russian company engaged in online propaganda
- Internet water army – Private paid Chinese Internet commentator
- Japanese nationalism
- Manga Kenkanryu – Anti-Korean manga series by Sharin Yamano
- Mass media in Japan
- Neo Gōmanism Manifesto Special – On War – 1995 controversial manga series
- Neo-Fascism – Post–World War II ideology
- Neo-nationalism – Type of nationalism that rose in the mid-2010s
- Neo-Nazism – Post-WWII Nazi-inspired ideologies
- Public opinion brigades – Communist Party of Vietnam groups
- Reactionary – Political view advocating return to a previous societal state
- Tokutei Asia – Japanese far-right concept
- Trumpism – American right-wing to far-right populist political ideology
- Uyoku dantai – Ultranationalist far-right groups in Japan
- Zaitokukai – Japanese far-right organization
