= Nobukatsu =

- Gender: Male

Origin
- Origin: Japanese
- Meaning: Different meanings depending on the kanji used

Nobukatsu (written: 信雄 or 信勝) is a masculine Japanese given name. Notable people with the name include:

- Nobukatsu Fujioka (藤岡 信勝; born 1943), Japanese academic
- Narimatsu Nobukatsu (成松 信勝; 1540–1584), Japanese samurai
- Oda Nobukatsu (織田 信雄; 1558–1630), Japanese samurai
