= Manga Kenkanryu =

Anti-Korean manga series by Sharin Yamano

- Cover of the first volume

マンガ 嫌韓流 (Manga Kenkanryū)
- Genre: Political
- Manga
- Written by: Sharin Yamano
- Published by: Shin-yo-sha
- Imprint: Shin-yo-sha Mook
- Original run: July 26, 2005 – March 19, 2015
- Volumes: 10

Manga Kenkanryu (Japanese: マンガ 嫌韓流, Hepburn: Manga Kenkanryū; 'Hating the Korean Wave' or 'Hating the Korean Boom') is a Japanese manga series written and illustrated by Sharin Yamano. Originally a webcomic published on Yamano's website in 2003, Shin-yo-sha began publishing the manga in print in July 2005. They published ten print volumes, with the last volume being released in March 2015. The manga follows Kaname Okiayu as he discusses various Japan–Korea disputes.

Following years of strained relations, in the 2000s, the Korean Wave gained prominence in Japan and helped Japan and South Korea improve their relations. Yamano, however, was not satisfied, believing that this trend was made up by the media. The manga's anti-Korean themes generated significant controversy both in Japan and abroad, with some describing Manga Kenkanryu as nationalist and xenophobic. It has also been noted for helping to popularize internet right-wing movements in Japan. However, it had little impact on Japan–South Korea relations or the Korean Wave.

== Plot ==
Kaname Okiayu, a Japanese high school senior, learns about an alleged game-fixing scandal responsible for the winning streak of the South Korean soccer team during the 2002 FIFA World Cup and alleged unsportsmanlike behavior by their supporters. Okiayu becomes a college freshman, and he and his female classmate Itsumi Aramaki join the Far East Asia Investigation Committee (極東アジア調査會), an extracurricular group led by Ryūhei Sueyuki (a junior) and Tae Soeuchi (a sophomore).

The group is mainly devoted to the study of historical disputes between Japan and Korea and is very critical of the latter. Okiayu and Aramaki learn about various controversial perspectives on Koreans. The group participates in debates with a pro-Korean study group and a group of students visiting from South Korea, both depicted as ignorant of history and unable to make logical arguments, and rebuts their pro-Korean opinions, humiliating them.

The main topics of book include an alleged 2002 FIFA World Cup game scandal, Japanese compensation to Korea for colonial rule, opposition to Zainichi Koreans suffrage, alleged Korean plagiarism of Japanese culture, criticism of pro-Korean mass media in Japan, criticism of Hangul (Korean alphabet), Japan–Korea Annexation, Liancourt Rocks dispute, and criticism of the Korean Wave and its immense popularity in Japan.

== Characters ==
Kaname Okiayu (沖鮎 要, Okiayu Kaname)
Originally an ordinary high school student believing that Japan had done bad things to Korea, and not particularly interested in history, his whose mind is changed after having a conversation with his grandfather.
Itsumi Aramaki (荒巻 いつみ, Aramaki Itsumi)
She convinces Kaname to join the "Far East Asia Investigation Committee".
Kōichi Matsumoto (松本 光一, Matsumoto Kōichi)
Kaname's best friend in high school, Kōichi is a Zainichi Korean who has a "troubling identity crisis". Within the story, he often tells Kaname and members of the committee that Koreans in Japan continue to experience discrimination.
Ryūhei Sueyuki (末行 隆平, Sueyuki Ryūhei)
He is the vice-chairman of the Far East Asia Research Association.
Tae Soeuchi (添内 多枝, Soeuchi Tae)
He is the chairman of the Far East Asia Research Association.

== Development ==
=== Context ===
Following the end of World War II and the onset of the Japanese economic miracle, nationalism declined as Japan tried to distance itself from the Imperial government. Professor Jean-Pierre Lehmann noted that when the Japanese asset price bubble burst and China began to resurge economically, nationalism rose. During this time, relations between Japan and South Korea were strained due to various issues stemming from Imperial Japan's actions leading up to the World War II, as well as territorial disputes. It was also noted that anti-Japanese sentiment in Korea remained prevalent, particularly with rap group DJ DOC's song "F Japan".

In 2003, the Korean drama Winter Sonata was aired on Japanese television, which is credited with starting the Korean Wave in Japan; it led to increased interest in Korean culture. The two countries' governments also began promoting cultural exchanges. The Japanese media regularly reported on the trend. During this time, the two countries were improving their relations, with Kim Dae-jung lifting the ban on Japanese cultural imports and the two countries jointly hosting the 2002 FIFA World Cup.

Sharin Yamano is a pen name of the anonymous creator. He felt that the Korean Wave was the creation of the media and that anti-Korean sentiment was widespread among Japanese netizens. Yamano was inspired by Yoshinori Kobayashi's Neo Gōmanism Manifesto Special – On War in creating the manga.

=== Publication ===
Written and illustrated by Yamano, the series originated as a webcomic published on his website beginning in 2003. Shin-yo-sha began publishing it in print on July 26, 2005. Several other publishes refused to publish it. Shin-yo-sha published ten volumes, with the last being released on March 19, 2015. Several other writers, such as Kanji Nishio and Takahiro Otsuki, also contributed to the series.

Another work, titled Manga Kenchugokuryu, where Yamano espouses anti-Chinese sentiments, was published. In 2005, Makoto Sakurai wrote Handbook Kenkanryu. Illustrated by Yamano, it serves as a companion to the main series.

== Analysis ==
Critics have described Manga Kenkanryu as nationalist and xenophobic. Scholars have noted that it simplifies many complex Japan–Korea disputes into "us" versus "them". It has also been noted for leveraging fear of communism. Historian Sheila Miyoshi Jager stated that the manga's content related to the Japanese colonization of Korea is a "gross oversimplification" and that it misunderstands its legacy. Manga Kenkanryu's plot has been compared to efforts by Japanese nationalists to whitewash history textbooks and controversial visits to the Yasukuni Shrine.

Critics have noted that the Japanese characters are drawn with Caucasian-like features, whereas the Korean characters are drawn with narrow eyes and distorted expressions, which have been described as "clearly Asian". Norimitsu Onishi of The New York Times noted that this aesthetic dates back to the Meiji Restoration in the 19th century, where Japanese intellectuals such as Yukichi Fukuzawa felt that the best way to resist Western colonial powers was to emulate them. Onishi also wrote that this aesthetic represents Japan's feelings of "superiority toward Asia and of inferiority toward the West".

== Reception ==
In Japan, the series received a mixed reception. Conservative newspaper Sankei Shimbun praised the work, stating that it has a "calm and balanced portrayal of Japanese-Korean issues", while liberal newspaper The Asahi Shimbun criticized Japanese society for popularizing the manga. Mainichi Shimbun refused to run advertisements for the manga. Manga artist Tetsuya Chiba criticized the manga, stating that he "apologizes on behalf of Japanese authors". Netizens on the textboard 2channel supported the manga and its message. The manga also helped popularize the netto-uyoku (internet right-wing) movements.

South Korea's three largest newspapers, The Chosun Ilbo, The Dong-A Ilbo, and JoongAng Ilbo, all ran editorials criticizing the manga. A spokesperson for the Embassy of South Korea, London said "[Manga Kenkanryu] contained numerous factual errors and that it would be dangerous if Japanese readers treated the comics as an accurate view of the real world". South Korean writer Yang Byeong-sol wrote a book, titled The Anti-Japan Wave, in response to Manga Kenkanryu, though it failed to garner attention in South Korea or Japan.

The first volume sold 300,000 copies within three months of its release. As of 2015, the series has 1 million copies in circulation.

=== Lawsuit ===
The third volume of Manga Kenkanryu discusses the murder of Lucie Blackman and its alleged perpetrator, Joji Obara, who is of Korean descent. Obara sued Yamano for defamation and breach of privacy following its publication. On March 5, 2009, the Tokyo High Court ruled that, while the benefits of including of Obara's ethnic background outweighed the privacy risk, Yamano's description nonetheless constituted an invasion of privacy and ordered Yamano to pay Obara ¥200,000.

=== Impact ===
Despite the controversy, the manga had little impact on Japan–South Korea relations or the Korean Wave. Scholars Matthew Allen and Rumi Sakamoto doubted that it actually influenced views of young Japanese people. Journalist Steven K. Vogel wrote "[Manga Kenkanryu] may be able to pique the curiosity of some comic book lovers and Net surfers, but they cannot stop Japanese housewives from pining for Korean soap opera stars" and pointed out that a majority of Japanese people still viewed Korea positively.

== See also ==
- Kō Bun'yū and George Akiyama, who wrote a manga with anti-Chinese themes
- Rhie Won-bok, a manhwa artist whose work has been accused of antisemitism
- Racism in Japan
- Zaitokukai, an anti-Korean organization
