= Nobukatsu Fujioka =

Japanese academic (born 1943)

Nobukatsu Fujioka (藤岡 信勝, Fujioka Nobukatsu) (born 1943) is both a founder and vice president of the Japanese Society for History Textbook Reform (新しい歴史教科書を作る会 atarashii rekishi kyōkasho wo tsukuru kai, abbreviated 作る会 Tsukurukai), now headed by Nishio Kanji). He was once a professor at the Tokyo University and later moved to Takushoku University. He is now retired.

He was born in Iwamizawa, Hokkaido, and raised in Shibecha, Hokkaido. He is noted for his efforts at removing from Japanese textbooks accounts of wartime atrocities committed by Japan during the Second World War. He is considered to be a conservative and a nationalist, and he has been quoted as saying that he "stand(s) for a viewpoint of history with an emphasis on national interest," and that the study of Japanese history is "subject to the ultimate moral imperative of whether or not it serves to inculcate a sense of pride in being Japanese." He has also said that to "write [a history] based only on verified historical truths makes...[it] insipid and dry. I had no choice but to write from my own imagination to a great extent."

In the early 1990s, Fujioka founded the Liberal View of History Study Group, which advocated "correcting history" by promoting a "positive view" of Japanese history and removing all references to what he referred to as "dark history." By 1995, he had created the Association for Advancement of Unbiased View of History (自由主義史観研究会, jiyūshugi shikan kenkyūkai) and the committee to Write New History Textbooks. Among Japan's top ten bestsellers in 1997 were two volumes edited by Fujioka, History The Textbooks Do Not Teach and Shameful Modern History.

In late 1996, Fujioka and his followers joined with others to form the Japanese Society for History Textbook Reform (Tsukurukai, now headed by Nishio Kanji). This group authored The New History Textbook, which was one of eight junior high school history textbooks authorized by the Ministry of Education in April 2001. In December 2000, a draft textbook circulated by the Society and shown on national television elicited criticism from many Japanese historians and teachers.

He is an assenter of the negationist film The Truth about Nanjing.

== See also ==
- Nippon Kaigi
