= Japan Institute for National Fundamentals =

Think tank in Tokyo, Japan

- Abbreviation: JINF
- Formation: 2007
- Type: think tank (public policy and foreign policy)
- Headquarters: Claire Hirakawa-cho #801, 2-16-5 Hirakawa-cho, Chiyoda-ku, Tokyo, 102-0093, Japan
- Location: Tokyo, Japan
- President: Yoshiko Sakurai
- Website: en.jinf.jp

The Japan Institute for National Fundamentals (国家基本問題研究所, Kokka Kihon Mondai Kenkyūjo) or Kokkiken (国基研) is a public and foreign policy think tank in Tokyo, Japan, privately funded and founded in December 2007 by Yoshiko Sakurai.

Sakurai started her career as a journalist for the Christian Science Monitor in Tokyo. She served as a news presenter on Nippon Television's late night news programme Kyō no Dekigoto from 1980 to 1996. She worked on the HIV-tainted blood scandal in Japan during the 1990s.

Affiliated with the openly revisionist lobby Nippon Kaigi, Sakurai denies sexual slavery by the Japanese imperial military during World War II (i.e. "comfort women"). She promoted Taniyama Yūjirō's 2015 Scottsboro Girls film in Japan and the United States, a revisionist film aimed at denying the sexual enslavement of comfort women.

In 2007, she supported a film about the Nanjing Massacre, The Truth About Nanjing. Satoru Mizushima, the director and producer of the film, has said the massacre is nothing more than propaganda.

She is the originator of the term "Tokutei Asia".

== Overview ==
It regularly gives policy proposals to the Japanese government and holds monthly "study" meetings and international symposiums.

== Membership ==
JINF has close ties to the ultranationalist organization Nippon Kaigi and many of its members also come from various ultranationalist textbook reform organizations/movements like Japanese Society for History Textbook Reform, Japan Education Rebirth Institute (Kyoiku Saisei), and Society to Improve Textbooks.

From Nippon Kaigi, some prominent members include chairman Tadae Takubo, secretary general Yuzo Kabashima, former Tokyo governor Shintaro Ishihara, and policy committee member Akira Momochi.

== Organization ==
References.

=== President ===
- Yoshiko Sakurai (Journalist)

=== Vice presidents ===
- Tadao TAKUBO (Professor Emeritus, Kyorin University, chair of Nippon Kaigi)
- Katsuhiko TAKAIKE (Lawyer)
- Yoshito OGURA (President of NIPPON ARCOIRIS)

=== Directors ===
- Hironobu ISHIKAWA (Journalist)
- Takashi ITO (Professor Emeritus, University of Tokyo)
- Yasuo OHARA (Professor Emeritus, Kokugakuin University)
- Minoru KITAMURA (Professor Emeritus, Ritsumeikan University)
- Tadashi SAITO (Former Director, Bungei Shunju Ltd.)
- Shiro TAKAHASHI (Professor, Meisei University)
- Ryutaro TSUCHIDA (Professor Emeritus, University of Tokyo)
- Taikin TEI (Chung Daekyun, 鄭大均, 정대균) (Professor Emeritus, Tokyo Metropolitan University)
- Tadashi NARABAYASHI (Professor Emeritus, Hokkaido University)
- Osamu NISHI (Professor Emeritus, Komazawa University)
- Koichiro BANSHO (Lieutenant General (Re+))
- Yoshifumi HIBAKO (Former Chief of Staff, JGSDF)
- Sukehiro HIRAKAWA (Professor Emeritus, University of Tokyo)
- Koichi FURUSHO (Former Chief of Staff, JMSDF)
- Hiroshi FURUTA (Professor, College of Social Sciences, University of Tsukuba)
- Tamao HOSOKAWA (Journalist)
- Akira MOMOCHI (Professor Emeritus, Nihon University)
- Yoshihiko YAMADA (Professor, Tokai University)
- Taro YAYAMA (Political Analyst)
- Hiroshi YUASA (Sankei Shimbun special press)
- Toshio WATANABE (Executive advisor for academic affairs, Takushoku University)

=== Auditor ===
- Yukio GOTO (Lawyer, Former Prosecutor at Kyoto Public Prosecutors Office)

== Publication ==
JINF publishes weekly short commentaries written by various professionals on current issues. The institute also publishes a newsletter reporting activities every other month for its members.

== Awards ==
Since 2014, the JINF has administered two annual prizes, a Kokkiken Japan Study Award and Japan Study Encouragement Award. Through these awards, the Foundation "encourages and honors outstanding works in the field of Japanese studies at home and abroad that contribute to the furthering of understanding of Japan in the areas of politics, national security, diplomacy, history, education and culture, among others."

== Funding ==
The Japan Institute for National Fundamentals is a fully private-funded think tank. There are three types of membership of the institute, Individual, Supporter and Corporate membership, all of which are completely open.
