= Neo Gomanism Manifesto Special – On Taiwan =

Japanese manga by Yoshinori Kobayashi

新・ゴーマニズム宣言SPECIAL 台湾論 (Shin Gōmanism Sengen Supesharu – Taiwan Ron)
- Manga
- Written by: Yoshinori Kobayashi
- Published by: Shogakukan
- Published: November 2000

Neo Gomanism Manifesto Special – On Taiwan (Japanese: 新・ゴーマニズム宣言SPECIAL 台湾論, Hepburn: Shin Gōmanism Sengen Supesharu – Taiwan Ron) is a manga written and illustrated by Yoshinori Kobayashi and published by Shogakukan in November 2000. A Chinese version was published in Taiwan by Avanguard Publishing in February 2001 sparking controversy and even imposing a travel ban on the author by Taiwanese officials.

== Criticism ==
Critics of the book say it distorts history by claiming that Taiwanese women volunteered as comfort women for Japanese soldiers during World War II. Such claims were backed by comments from petrochemical Chi Mei Corporation Chairman Hsu Wen-lung whom the author cited as confirming that no women were forced into prostitution.

== Responses to the book ==
Taiwan legislators and other protesters stormed Taipei's biggest bookstore, grabbing the books and setting them on fire on the sidewalk.

On 2 March 2001, the Ministry of the Interior of the Republic of China barred Kobayashi from travel to Taiwan, igniting objections from high ranking government officials including National Policy Advisor Alice King. President Chen Shui-bian spoke out in defense of King and Kobayashi stating that freedom of speech is the right of everyone and must be safeguarded. The ban was lifted on 23 March 2001.

== See also ==
- Yoshinori Kobayashi
  - Neo Gomanism Manifesto Special – On War
- Comfort women
