= Fei hua qing han =

Chinese poem

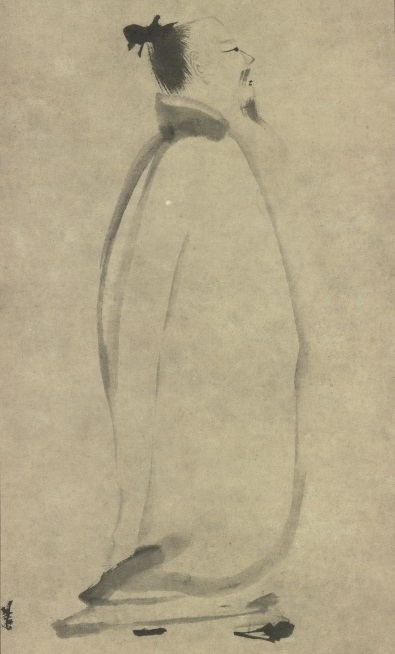
Li Bai was an influential poet of the Tang dynasty

Fei hua qing han (simplified Chinese: 飞花轻寒; traditional Chinese: 飛花輕寒; pinyin: Fēi huā qīng hán) is an apocryphal poem falsely attributed to Li Bai, an influential 8th-century Chinese poet. The poem attracted attention in the Chinese Internet community when some people deciphered a hidden message in it that says "Go to hell Japan, Koizumi must die" (日本去死, 小泉定亡). It was later revealed that the poem was written around 2003 to 2004.

"Fei hua qing han" roughly means "a cold and flying chain of flowers".

== Background ==
Following along with the Japanese history textbook controversies and a decline in Sino-Japanese relations, the poem began to circulate over China internet community via forwarded email and internet forums around 2003 to 2004. The circulation peaked during the 2005 anti-Japanese demonstrations.

It was quickly revealed that not only does the cadence of the poem fail to match the tradition of Tang poetry, its writing style also differs from that of Li Bai. The archive of Li Bai also does not contain any such poem.

The real author is yet to be revealed, but it is believed to be written by a mainland Chinese angered by Japan's denial of World War II war crimes.

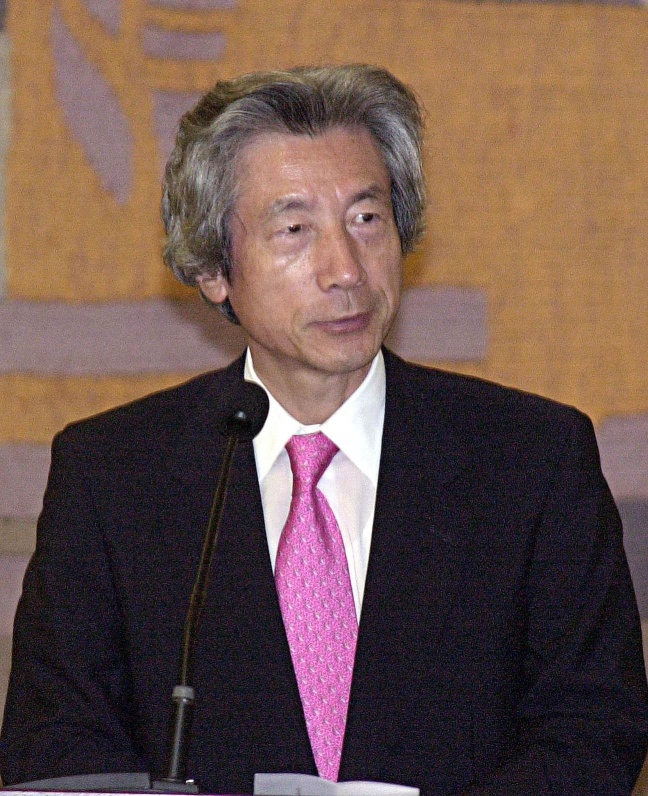
Junichiro Koizumi's frequent visits to Yasukuni Shrine made him a target for Chinese nationalists.

Reaction to the poem has been mixed. Although its authenticity has been doubted from the beginning, some claimed that it was an "insight" of Li Bai who would foresee the war crime of Japan. Some Chinese felt disgraced by the humor, and blamed the author was so childish and shameful to imitate Li Bai in a bad taste apocryphal poem. However, most people simply took it as a joke.

== Content ==
Original poem:

日暮蒼山蘭舟小，
本無落霞綴清泉。
去年葉落緣分定，
死水微漾人卻亡。

Rìmù cāngshān lánzhōu xiǎo,
běn wú luò xiá zhuì qīngquán.
Qùnián yè luò yuánfèn dìng,
sǐshuǐ wēi yàng rén què wáng.

A rough translation:

When daylight waned at mountains, an orchid-wood boat left
A cloud didn't belong to this brook
When maple-leaves fell last year, our fates were clear
A stagnant pool of water can still sway, but you have forever gone away.

Taking the first and last characters of each line as a single sentence, it reads "Go to hell Japan, Koizumi must die" (日本去死, 小泉定亡 Rìběn qù sǐ, Xiǎoquán dìng wáng).

In Chinese literature, there is a long tradition of hiding sensitive messages, mostly political related ones, in the lines of a poem. These hidden messages can be seen by reading the poem horizontally, diagonally, clockwise or anti-clockwise. One famous example is a poem protesting against Chinese prime minister Li Peng, after the 1989 Tiananmen Square protests and massacre. The poem seemingly showed strong support for the communist-governed China, and was published by the People's Daily in 1991, but when read diagonally, it showed a slogan "Li Peng must resign to appease anger of the people", which embarrassed the Chinese government.
