= Narimatsu =

Narimatsu (written: 成松) is a Japanese surname. Notable people with the surname include:

- Daisuke Narimatsu (成松 大介, born 1989), Japanese boxer
- Narimatsu Nobukatsu (成松 信勝, 1540–1584), Japanese samurai
