= Korean history textbook controversies =

Education controversies in South Korea

Korean textbook controversy refers to controversial content in government-approved history textbooks used in the secondary education (high schools) in South Korea. The controversies primarily concern portrayal of North Korea and the description of the regime of the South Korean president and dictator Park Chung Hee.

== Historical context ==
The controversy's origins can be traced at least to 2013, when South Korea's Ministry of Education instructed publishers to revise their history textbooks. In 2015 the South Korean National Institute of Korean History announced plans to replace existing history textbooks in high schools with one authorized version by March 2017. The state-issued textbooks are to be written by a government-appointed panel of experts.

In the larger context, this controversy is a part of an ongoing dispute on whether the state should control the content of history textbooks, and possibly enforce a monopoly, or whether individual schools (or teachers) should be free to choose their own textbooks. South Korea used to have state control over textbooks until the rules were relaxed in 2003 leading to the appearance of several competing textbooks used since, particularly since 2010.

== Criticisms ==
Existing textbooks have been criticized by the government as well as by the Korean right or conservative side for being too positive on North Korean topics, and for "liberal, left-leaning" bias. On the other hand, the left, also described as liberals and progressives, represented among others by The Hankyoreh newspaper, are critical of the changes such as removing any mentions of the Geochang massacre and excluding photos of the first North–South summit, which they have described as biased towards a conservative view of history and the state that lends legitimacy to the pre-democratic, authoritarian, conservative governments. In particular, the regime of Park Chung Hee, the father of the then current Korean president, Park Geun-hye, is seen by liberals as given a "white-wash" treatment by the new revisions. The conservatives rebuke that the current textbooks describe Park Chung Hee and his predecessor, Syngman Rhee, in an excessively negative manner. Other controversial topics involve the framing of the pro-democratic protests against Park's regime, or the inclusion of the story of Korean teenage heroine Yu Gwan-sun.

Liberals had also criticized the action on the grounds that the government control over textbooks is limiting freedom of speech and spreading propaganda. As of October 22, 2015, a petition against the new textbook reform had over 50,000 signatures. The government has also been facing several lawsuits, including one by the current textbook authors who accuse the government of libel. The plan has been described as controversial, and has led to public protests. Over 400 Korean history professors have expressed their opposition to the proposal. Outside Korea, the proposal has been criticized by over 200 professors of Korean studies. An opinion poll showed the Korean public opinion divided into approximately 50% against the new textbook plan, and 36% in favor.

Several commentators compared this to the comfort women issue, noting that with the recent government interference into the content of history books, South Korea is losing its moral high ground from which it previously criticized the Japanese government for its perceived historical textbook problems.The debate has also extended into academic circles, where some scholars, including Lee Young-hoon, have questioned elements of prevailing nationalist historiography.

== See also ==
- Korean nationalist historiography
