= 2005 anti-Japanese demonstrations =

Series of protests in East Asia

The anti-Japanese demonstrations of 2005 were a series of demonstrations, some peaceful, some violent, which were held across China in the spring of 2005. They were sparked off by a number of issues, including the approval of a Japanese history textbook and the proposal that Japan be granted a permanent seat on the United Nations Security Council.

Across China, businesses with connections to Japan were vandalized by protesters, as were billboards advertising Japanese goods and stores stocking Japanese-made products. Most of the damage was caused to businesses which were Chinese-owned and operated. Several Japanese nationals residing in China were injured in the violence, though there were no known fatalities.

== Demonstrations ==
=== Mainland China ===
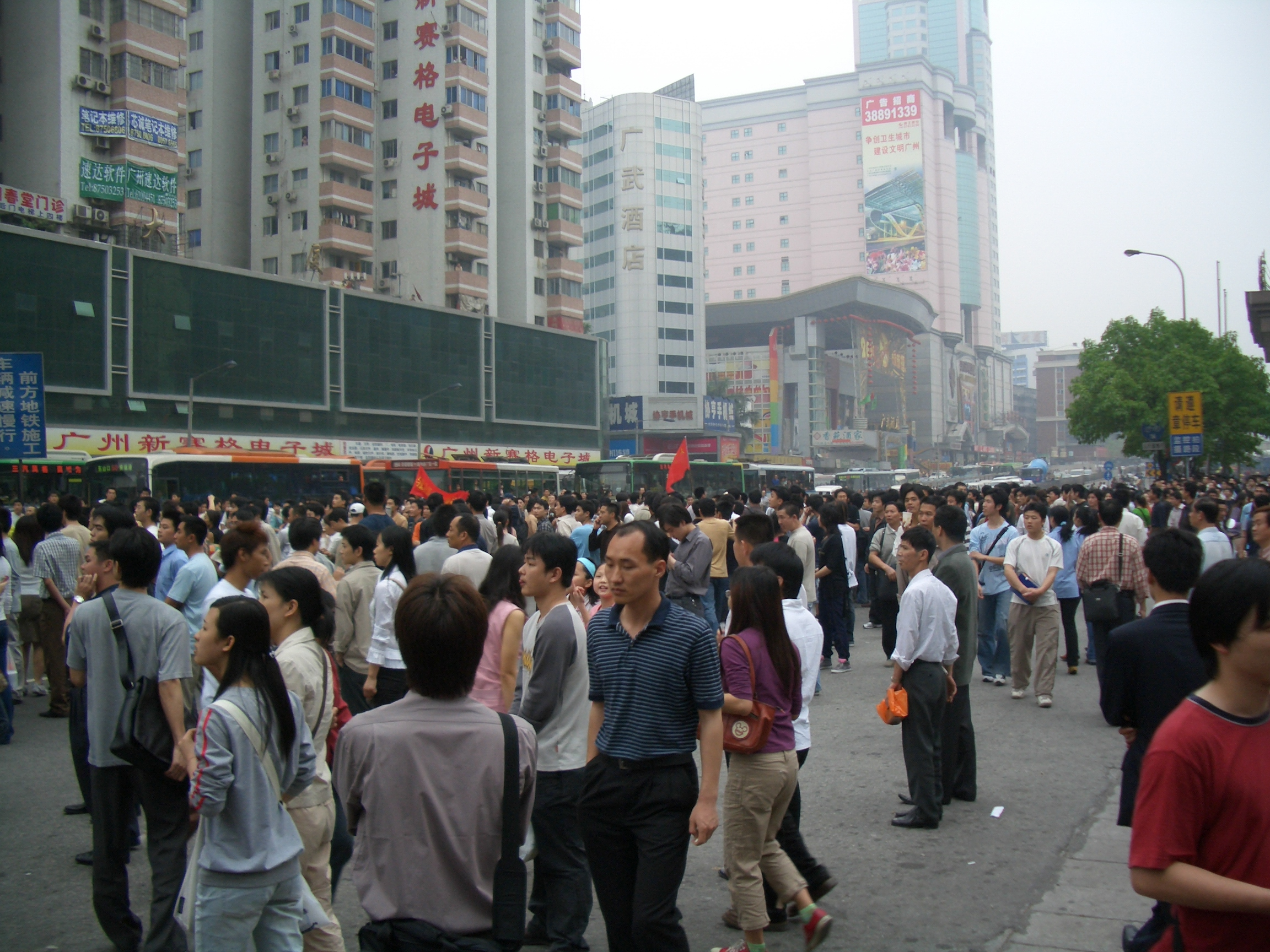
Anti-Japanese march in Guangzhou on April 10, 2005.

In March 2005, demonstrations were organized in several cities in the People's Republic of China (PRC), including Chongqing, Guangzhou, Shenzhen, Zhengzhou, Shenyang, Ningbo, Harbin, Chengdu, Luoyang, Qingdao, Changsha, Hefei, Beijing, Wuhan, Fuzhou, Hangzhou and Shanghai. In some cases, demonstrators attacked and damaged Japanese embassies, consulates, supermarkets, restaurants (mostly franchise businesses owned by Chinese) as well as people, prompting the Japanese government to demand an apology and compensation for damages.

The official PRC attitude towards the demonstrations is considered by foreign observers as enigmatic. On the one hand, the government allowed the demonstrations to occur in the first place. While the PRC policed the protests, some observers believe that measures to rein in the violence and property damage were deliberately ineffective. However, the PRC has only indirectly reported the current protests in state-owned media, withholding coverage from a national audience. State-owned media in the PRC nevertheless carried extensive coverage of anti-Japanese demonstrations in South Korea, as well as distant but related events, such as the European commemoration of the liberation of the Buchenwald concentration camp. Internet censorship has been extended to subjects related to the protests. Many universities prohibited students from coming onto or leaving the campus. Mass transit systems in close proximity to protest rally points were shut down. However, this policy was contradicted in several cities, including Beijing, where city buses were used by the municipal authorities to ferry students into the protests. Students at Tsinghua and Peking Universities also reported receiving phone calls from university authorities encouraging them to demonstrate. In the second half of April 2005, the People's Daily published several articles to calm down the protesters, and the Ministry of Public Security declared that "unauthorized marches were illegal".

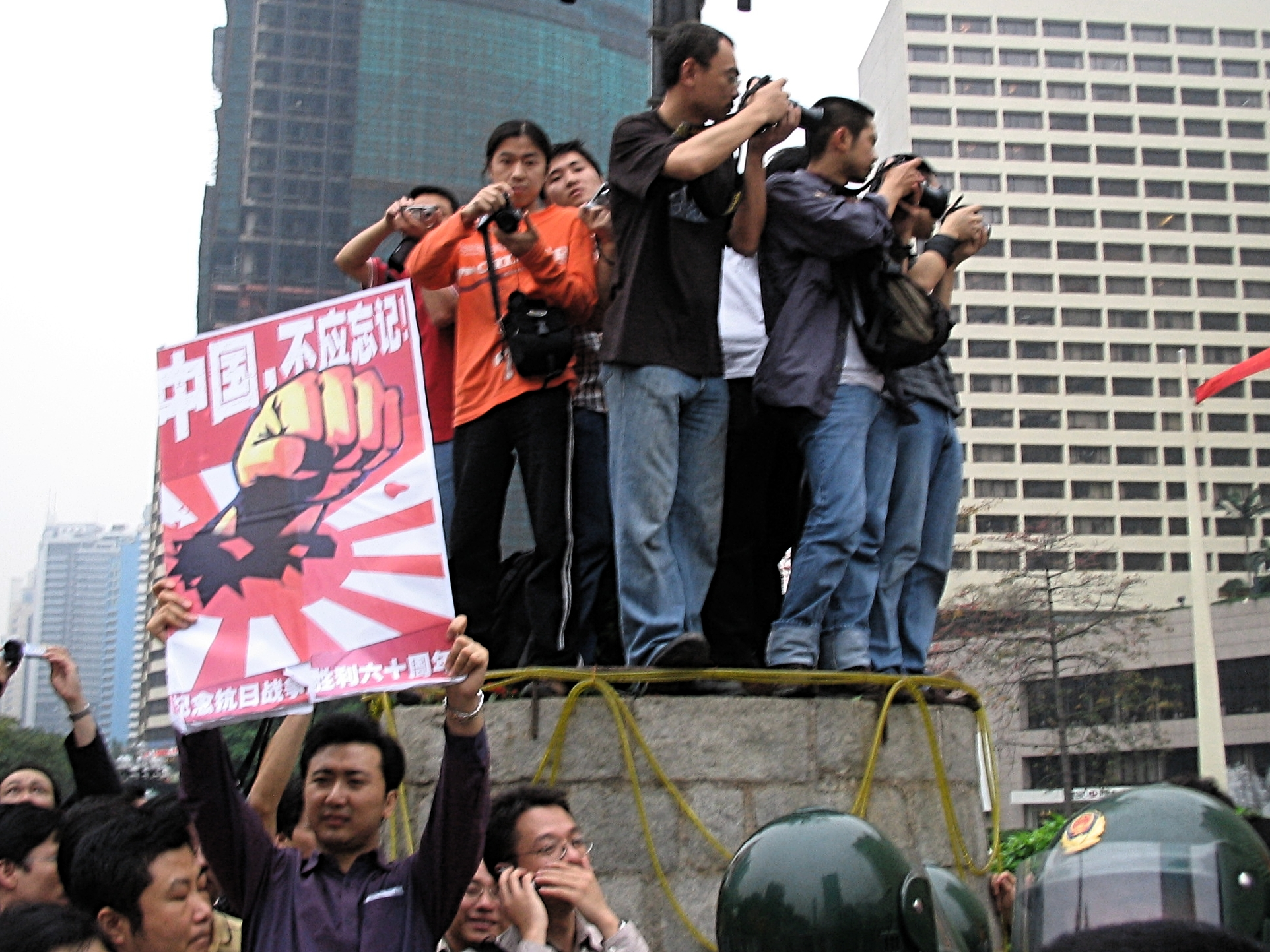
Protesters displaying a sign that reads "China shall not forget" (中国，不应忘记)

PRC police tactics are perceived to be similar to those utilized when demonstrations were held outside the American embassy in Beijing after NATO forces bombed the PRC embassy in Belgrade, Yugoslavia in May 1999.

The slogan "patriotism is not a sin" (Chinese: 爱国无罪; pinyin: àiguó wúzuì; lit. 'patriotism [is] no crime') is popular, albeit in a sarcastic sense, among the PRC protesters.

Political observers on the U.S. National Public Radio have argued that the controversy is being allowed by the Chinese Communist Party partly in order to further a multitude of political goals. American news outlets CNN and Time Magazine have also pointed out that historical inaccuracies are not limited to Japanese textbooks, but that Chinese government-made textbooks are equally rife with omissions and non-neutral point of view. Cases of questioned text include the Great Leap Forward, China's 1979 war with Vietnam, and the Cultural Revolution ("lots of appalling events happened"). Tibet is a subject given scant mention except by foreign press, and Xinjiang remains detached from the ongoing controversy.

==== Japanese response to Chinese protests ====
In Japan, no large-scale anti-PRC rallies or demonstrations took place, although a small number of protesters demonstrated outside PRC consulates, and in one case a spent cartridge case was mailed to Chinese officials. Nevertheless, more and more people canceled their travel plans to China, and some doubt was raised about the 2008 Summer Olympics, scheduled to be held in Beijing.

The Japanese foreign minister visited Beijing to meet his counterpart on April 17. The Xinhua News Agency reported that in the meeting held in Beijing between PRC and Japanese foreign ministers, the Japanese minister offered an apology for Japan's wrongdoings during World War II. However, Xinhua omitted in its report that in this meeting the Japanese negotiators demanded an apology and compensation for damage against Japanese property and people. That demand was rejected by Li Zhaoxing, the Chinese foreign minister. Meanwhile, the Japanese foreign ministry officially denied the news reports from the state-controlled Xinhua News Agency, which reports little about the ongoing patriotic demonstrations in major Chinese cities.

The Tokyo Stock Exchange recorded a sharp plunge on Monday, April 18, and correlations between the demonstrations and Sino-Japanese economic ties are raised in the financial industry.

Japanese Prime Minister Junichiro Koizumi expressed his "deep remorse and heartfelt apology" for the suffering that Japan caused other Asian nations during World War II at the Asia-Africa Conference in Jakarta, Indonesia on April 22. However, 81 Diet members visited Yasukuni Shrine hours before, causing more controversy inside and outside Japan about the true attitude of Tokyo on this subject. Koizumi met with General Secretary of the Chinese Communist Party Hu Jintao on April 23.

=== Taiwan ===
Although in the past, the government of the Republic of China on Taiwan has been severely critical of the content of Japanese history textbooks, in the wave of 2005 revisions of the textbooks, Taiwan has, for the most part, been much quieter than the PRC. This is indicative of the relatively high level of tension in the relationship between the PRC and the ROC and the comparatively good relations between Taiwan and Japan. Earlier in 2005, Japan and the United States had issued a joint declaration calling for a "peaceful solution" to the Taiwan issue, a declaration that angered the PRC, which protested that this declaration constituted interference in "internal affairs".

=== Hong Kong ===
In late April 2005, peaceful marches and rallies concerning Japanese war crimes during the occupation of Hong Kong took place. The Government of Hong Kong also issued a statement of protest against the official approval of the 2005 Japanese history textbooks.

=== North Korea ===
In 2005, North Korea condemned the official approval of the revision of Japanese textbooks. One official was quoted as calling the textbooks "philistinism peculiar to Japan, a vulgar and shameless political dwarf".

=== South Korea ===
South Korea vigorously protested the official approval of the 2005 Japanese history textbooks. South Korean Minister of Trade Kim Hyun-Chong canceled a planned visit to an Asian trade summit in Japan.

On May 6, 2005, in a meeting between then-President Roh Moo-hyun and Liberal Democratic Party's Secretary General Tsutomu Takebe, President Roh demanded Japan takes step to properly educate its citizens. He told Takemura that the teaching of history should not be treated as the academic matter and freely discussed but as the political matter and with the responsibility falling on the government to control it.

=== Philippines ===
Similar to Taiwan, the Philippines has been much quieter than other Asian countries invaded by the Japanese during World War II, even though many atrocities were committed by the invading Japanese during the war, such as the systematic rape of Filipino women whom the Japanese referred to as comfort women. An estimated one million Filipinos were killed during the war, out of a wartime population of 17 million, and many more were injured. Nearly every Filipino family was hurt by the war on some level. Despite this, "Filipinos are not as offended as the Chinese or the Koreans are, for example, about the fact that these atrocities are given only fleeting attention in Japanese classrooms, if at all...". The soothing of Filipino anger towards Japanese imperialism is helped by close ties with the Japanese people and cooperation of Japan government with the Philippines government for infrastructure building and rural development. However, many Filipinos still do harbor anger toward the Japanese government. For example, there are the anti Japanese-U.S. military alliance protests and the comfort women issues.

== Specific issues ==
=== Textbook controversy ===
A significant contributing factor to the demonstrations was Japanese state approval of the "Atarashii Rekishi Kyōkasho" (新しい歴史教科書, the New History Textbook) written by the Japanese Society for History Textbook Reform.

According to critics, the textbook covers up Japanese war crimes committed during the First Sino-Japanese War, in Japan's annexation of Korea in 1910, the Second Sino-Japanese War, and in World War II.

Japan's official policy is that publishers have the right to freedom of speech. The central government does have the right to stop textbooks from being published (see Japanese history textbook controversies), provided that they do not contain factual errors or personal opinions. The particular concern of the 2005 demonstrations was the textbook of the Japanese Society for History Textbook Reform. Since its official authorization in 2001, this textbook has hampered relations between Japan and its East Asian neighbors, primarily Korea and China. In early 2005, news of the Japanese government's re-authorization of the "Atarashii Rekishi Kyokasho" led to multinational public protest demonstrations. The textbook has been publicly denounced by the Japan Teachers' Union. According to a CNN article in April 2004, it is being used by only 18 of the nation's 11,102 junior high schools. According to a recent Asahi Shimbun article from September 2005, in the four years since its initial adoption, the textbook is only being used in 0.04% of Japan's junior high schools, which is far from the 10% penetration that the Japanese Society for History Textbook Reform had aimed for.

The United Nations Human Rights Commission, the United States House of Representatives, the European Parliament and the Dutch and Canadian Parliaments have issued reports and passed resolutions calling on Japan to take clear, full and open responsibility for the war crimes of the Japanese military against women who were forced into prostitution during World War II.

=== Nanjing Massacre ===
Widespread atrocities were committed by the Imperial Japanese Army in and around now Nanjing, China, after the capital's fall to Japanese troops on 13 December 1937. This event and associated atrocities breeds considerable anger in many Chinese today. The Japanese textbook in question only briefly mentions the atrocities committed and refers to Nanjing Massacre as follows:

many Chinese soldiers and civilians were killed or wounded by Japanese troops (the Nanjing Incident). Documentary evidence has raised doubts about the actual number of victims claimed by the incident. The debate continues even today" (p. 49).

While the use of the word "incident" is standard Japanese historiographical terminology for focal events, such as Tiananmen "Incident" (天安門事件) rather than massacre, it is objected to by Chinese as a deliberate playing down of the events in question.

=== Japan's membership in the UN Security Council ===
Another contribution to the spark in anti-Japanese sentiment in 2005 was Japan's bid for permanent membership on the United Nations Security Council (UNSC). Japanese Foreign Minister Aichi first applied for permanent member status in 1969, but failed to win support from the international community. In September 2004, the G4 nations (Brazil, Germany, India and Japan) issued a joint declaration supporting each other's bids for permanent membership status on the UNSC. Current P5 members France and the United Kingdom supported their bid, but there was strong sentiment against the idea from Japan's Far Eastern neighbors, including P5 member, China. Suggestions have been made that affording Japan too much power on an international level could result in the re-emergence of Japanese imperialism, and that Japan should not be given a seat given what many consider to be a lack of repentance for their wartime atrocities.

=== Comfort women ===
Comfort women were women who worked as sex slaves in brothels in Japanese-occupied countries during World War II. There is much controversy surrounding this subject namely, to what extent the women were forced and to who moral culpability falls on. On one side, some groups in Japan claimed that prior to Japanese expansion, brothels always existed in the eastern and southeastern regions of Asia in order to service European and American sailors and merchant vessels. Most of academia, especially of nations outside Japan, assert that the majority of comfort women were young girls abducted from their homes and forced into prostitution by the Japanese government and Imperial Japanese Army as sexual slaves and demand Japan take responsibility and formally apologize and educate the next generation about such an atrocity.

=== Testing of chemical and biological weapons on civilians and POWs ===
In 1942, the Japanese military began testing various chemical and biological agents as an alternate method to win the war. Human experiments were conducted on Chinese and ethnic Korean civilians; Allied POWs were also subjected to experimentation. After the war, China (PRC) demanded data from these experiments in exchange for not raising the issue, while the U.S. granted immunity from prosecution to many of the scientists involved (see Unit 731) in exchange for their weapons research.

=== Senkaku Islands ===
The Senkaku Islands, known in Chinese as the Diaoyu Islands, are a group of islands in the East China Sea with an area of 7 km^{2}. Japan currently has control over the islands, but both the People's Republic of China and the Republic of China government on Taiwan claim them. Tensions over the islands have surfaced in the late 1990s and were one issue in the 2005 protests in China.

=== Gas and oil in the East China Sea ===
Both China and Japan are interested in exploiting deposits of natural gas and oil in the Xihu Trough of the East China Sea. Both countries are net importers of energy, and the energy needs of China are mushrooming. The U.S. Department of Energy notes a moderate estimate of 100 billion barrels of oil in the South China Sea. notes

China has been drilling in the Xihu Trough since 2003. China's claims to these islands come from its claim of the entire continental shelf. Japan's claim is by the standard 200 nautical mile (370 km) EEZ international maritime treaty. Practically speaking, both nations have split the territory. Japan fears that Chinese drilling is likely to remove oil from Japan's side of territory claimed by Japan through suction. After two years of repeated requests to China to disclose information on the deposits in the hope of co-development, on April 13, 2005, Japan granted drilling rights to two Japanese companies, a move immediately protested by the Chinese as the drilling will take place in disputed territorial waters. The companies have not yet been formally granted permission to drill and this is expected to take several months. China National Offshore Oil Corporation, a Chinese, state-owned company, plans to drill near the disputed EEZ line between China and Japan beginning in August.

== See also ==
- List of war apology statements issued by Japan
- Anti-Japanese sentiment
- Anti-Japanese sentiment in China
- Anti-Japanese sentiment in Korea
- Fei hua qing han
- Historical revisionism
- Japanese war crimes
- Nanjing Massacre denial
- Japanese Society for History Textbook Reform
- Japan Teachers' Union
- Senkaku Islands
- Liancourt Rocks
- China–Japan relations
- Chinese nationalism
- Sinocentrism
- Fenqing
- Japanese nationalism
- 2012 China anti-Japanese demonstrations
