= Tsunehira Furuya =

Japanese critic

Tsunehira Furuya (古谷 経衡 Furuya Tsunehira; born November 10, 1982 Sapporo, Hokkaido, Japan) is a Japanese critic, writer, and political activist. Since November 2014, he has been the president of the non-profit Koto Video Promotion Agency.
