= Japanese Society for History Textbook Reform =

Japanese policy advocacy organization

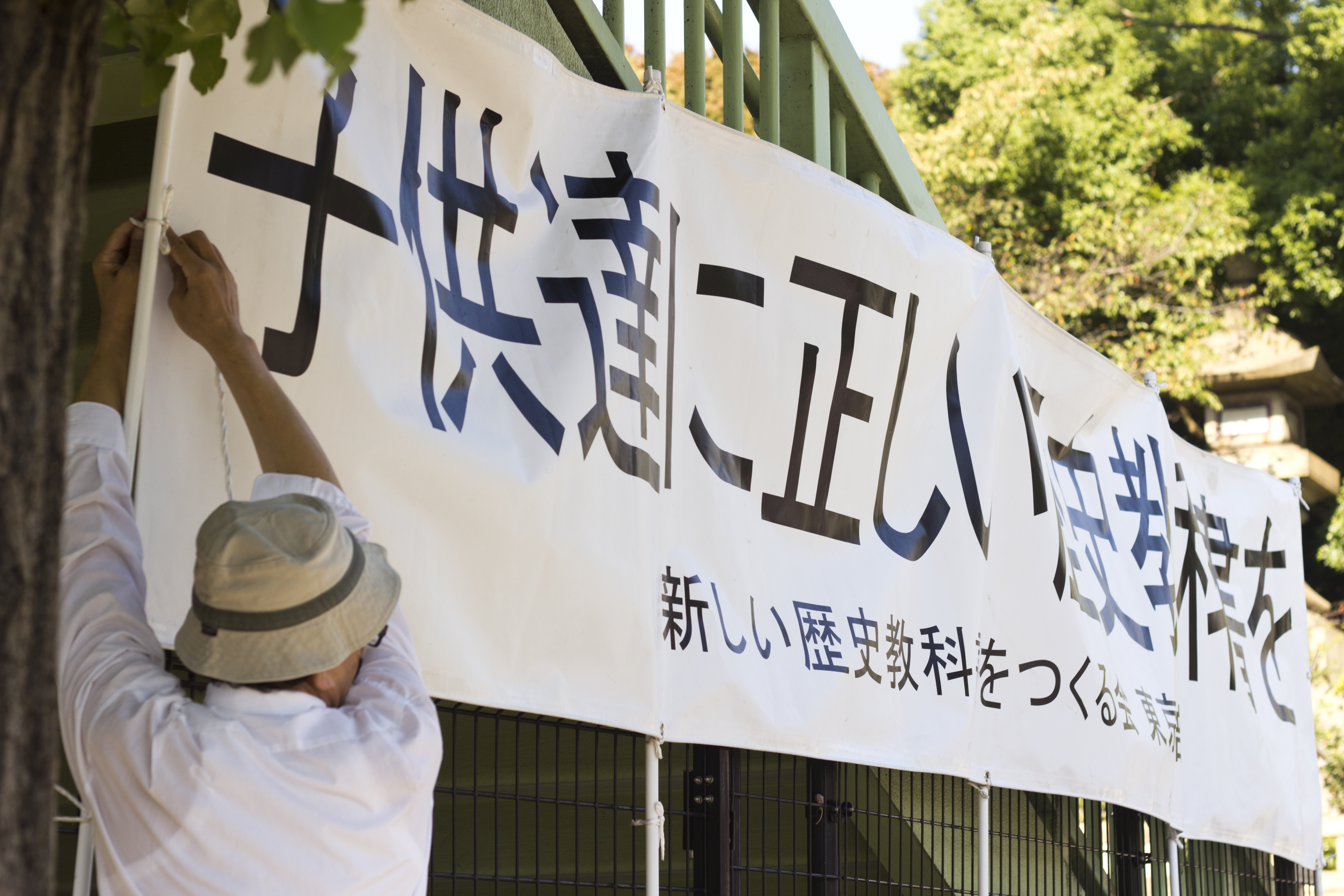
Member of the Japanese Society for History Textbook Reform putting up a banner reading "[Give] the children correct history textbooks" in front of Yasukuni Shrine (靖国神社)

The Japanese Society for History Textbook Reform (新しい歴史教科書をつくる会, Atarashii Rekishi Kyōkasho o Tsukuru Kai) is a group founded in December 1996 to promote a nationalistic view of the history of Japan.

== Productions and views ==
The Japanese Society for History Textbook Reform describes their goal as combatting what it sees as masochistic depictions of Japanese history. They argue that textbooks focus too heavily on dark aspects of Japanese history, so as to make Japan solely bear responsibility for the devastation of war. The group also claims that post-war American occupation attempted to mold Japanese perceptions of history so as to prevent the country from becoming a threat to international security again.

In 1999 the group set up advertising organizations for their new textbook in each prefecture of Japan and in 2000, along with other nationalist NGOs in Japan, they began lobbying boards of education to adopt the new textbook. Additionally, members of the Liberal Democratic Party set up associations to support the Japanese Society for History Textbook Reform. The textbook was ultimately approved, but received domestic and international criticism. Due to criticism, the textbook was adopted by only 0.05 percent of junior high schools in Japan.

Their history textbook Atarashii rekishi kyōkasho (新しい歴史教科書, New History Textbook), published by Fusosha (扶桑社), was heavily criticised for not including full accounts of or downplaying Imperial Japanese war crimes during World War II, such as the Nanjing Massacre, the Kantō Massacre, and the policy of utilizing comfort women.

The textbook also highlights Japan's claim to the Liancourt Rocks, which Japan calls Takeshima and which South Korea calls Dokdo; as well as the Senkaku Islands, called Diaoyu in Chinese, which are administered by Japan and claimed by both the People's Republic of China and the Republic of China (Taiwan).

== Public reception ==
The textbook, published as a trade book in Japan in June 2001, sold six hundred thousand copies by June 2004. Despite commercial success, the book was taken up by only a handful of schools – six schools for disabled children run by the Tokyo and Ehime prefectural government and seven private schools, comprising 0.03% of junior high students in the 2002 school year.

=== New History Textbook 2005 version ===
Translated by Japanese Society for History Textbook Reform.

1. Nanjing Massacre:
  "In August 1937, two Japanese soldiers, one an officer, were shot to death in Shanghai (the hub of foreign interests). After this incident, the hostilities between Japan and China escalated. Japanese military officials thought Chiang Kai-shek would surrender if they captured Nanking, the Nationalist capital; they occupied that city in December. *But Chiang Kai-shek had moved his capital to the remote city of Chongqing. The conflict continued. Note *At this time, many Chinese soldiers and civilians were killed or wounded by Japanese troops (the Nanking Incident). Documentary evidence has raised doubts about the actual number of victims claimed by the incident. The debate continues even today" (p. 49).
2. Marco Polo Bridge Incident:
  "On July 7, 1937, shots were fired at Japanese soldiers while they were engaged in maneuvers near Marco Polo Bridge (located outside Beijing). By the next day, this incident (the Marco Polo Bridge Incident) had escalated into hostilities with Chinese troops. The incident was of relatively small magnitude, and efforts were made to resolve it locally. But Japan decided to send a large number of troops to China when the Nationalist government issued an emergency mobilization order. These events marked the beginning of a war that lasted for eight long years" (p. 49).
3. Greater East Asia Co-Prosperity Sphere:
  "The war inflicted a huge amount of devastation and suffering on the peoples of Asia, where it was fought. The casualties (both military and civilian) attributable to Japanese invasions were particularly high in China. Each time the Japanese occupied a Southeast Asian nation, they set up a military administration. Leaders of local independence movements cooperated with those military administrations so that they could liberate their countries from the yoke of the Western powers. But when the Japanese insisted that local populations learn the Japanese language and worship at Shinto shrines, they met with resistance. Anti-Japanese elements who aligned themselves with the Allies engaged in guerrilla warfare, which Japanese troops dealt with severely. Many people, civilians included, were killed during these confrontations. When the fortunes of war turned against Japan and food supplies ran short, the Japanese often forced the local population to do back-breaking work. After the war was over, Japan paid reparations to those nations. Then Japan was accused of promoting the Greater East Asia Co-Prosperity Sphere philosophy to justify the war and occupation of Asia. Later, after Japan was defeated and Japanese troops had withdrawn from Asia, all these former colonies achieved independence through their own efforts during the next dozen years. Some Japanese soldiers remained in Asia and participated in the various struggles for independence. The initial goal of Japan's southward advance was to obtain resources, but it also served to spur on nascent independence movements in Asia" (p. 54)
4. Japanese Actions Inspire the Peoples of Asia:
  "Japanese soldiers drove out the forces of Western Europe, which had colonized the nations of Asia for many years. They surprised us, because we didn't think we could possibly beat the white man, and they inspired us with confidence. They awakened us from our long slumber, and convinced us to make the nation of our ancestors our own nation once again. We cheered the Japanese soldiers as they marched through the Malay Peninsula. When we saw the defeated British troops fleeing, we felt an excitement we had never experienced before. (Excerpt from the writings of Raja Dato Nong Chik, leader of the Malaysian independence movement and former member of the Malaysian House of Representatives)" (page 54)

== See also ==
- 2005 anti-Japanese demonstrations
- Education in Japan
- Japanese history textbook controversies
- Japan Teachers' Union
- Japanese nationalism
- Japanese war crimes
- Japan–Korea disputes
- Manga Kenkanryu
- Ministry of Education, Culture, Sports, Science and Technology
- Nanjing Massacre denial
- Historical negationism
- Nippon Kaigi
- War crimes in Manchukuo
- Yoshinori Kobayashi
- Neo Gōmanism Manifesto Special – On War
