= Noritoshi Furuichi =

Japanese sociologist and novelist (born 1985)

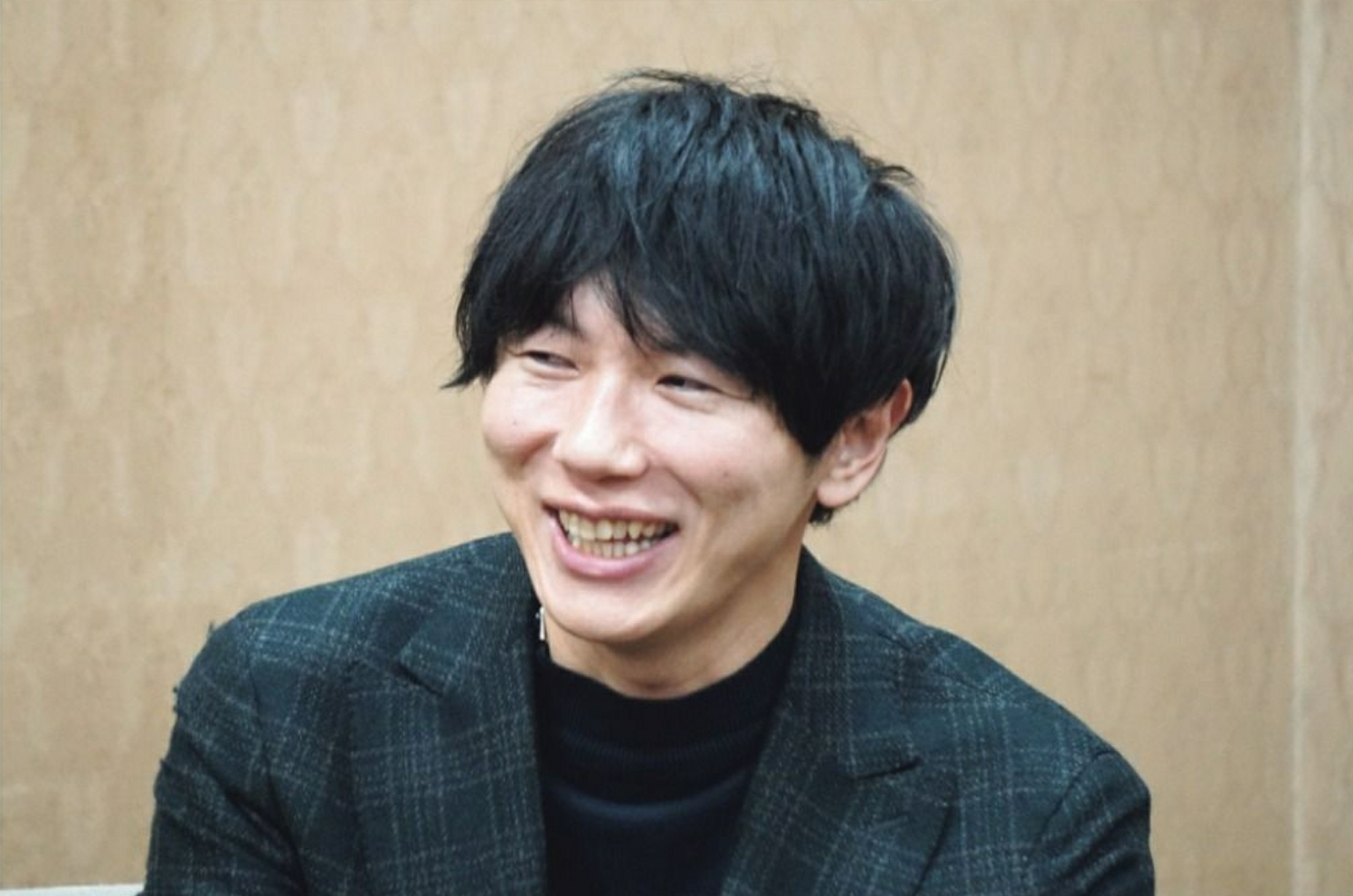
- Born: 14 January 1985 (age 41); Sumida, Tokyo, Japan
- Education: Keio University, Tokyo University
- Occupations: Sociologist; author; novelist
- Years active: 2011
- Known for: Sociology
- Notable work: The Happy Youth of a Desperate Country
- Website: furuichi.themedia.jp; Noritoshi Furuichi on X

Noritoshi Furuichi (古市憲寿, Furuichi Noritoshi) is Japanese sociologist and novelist. He is also a TV personality. He is also known for his best-selling book Zetsubō no Kuni no Kōfuku na Wakamono-tachi (The Happy Youth of a Desperate Country).

== Early life ==
Furuichi was born in Sumida, Tokyo in 1985. His father was from Kagoshima Prefecture and was a government employee who moved to Tokyo when he entered university, and his mother was a liberal-minded person. He is the eldest of three siblings and has two younger sisters.

Furuichi grew up in a very individualistic family. He was raised in an environment where he did not conform to those around him, with one television set per person and buffet-style meals. He grew up under the influence of his grandfather, whose hobbies included reading and drawing.

The family moved to Saitama Prefecture when he was in elementary school. After graduating from Koshigaya Kita High School, Furuichi entered the Faculty of Environment and Information Studies at Keio University in 2003. He was an exchange student in Oslo, Norway from 2005 to 2006. Furuichi said he studied abroad to escape from job hunting and went to Norway with a vague image of a country with high welfare and happiness. In reality, however, he was surprised to find that Norwegians live a simple life, not liking competition, with much less entertainment and stimulation than in Japan. After graduating from Keio University in 2007, he enrolled in and completed the Master's Course in Correlative Social Sciences, International Social Sciences, Graduate School of Arts and Sciences, University of Tokyo. Graduate School of Arts and Sciences.

== Career ==
In his books, articles, and TV appearances, Furuichi focuses on the circumstances of young people living in contemporary Japan. His most well-known book is The Happy Youth of a Desperate Country (Zetsubō no Kuni no Kōfuku na Wakamono-tachi), a best-selling book released by Kodansha in 2011 where Furuichi makes the argument that, regardless of looming problems with the social security system and a host of other societal challenges, Japanese youth (those in their 20s) are now happier than ever before. This assertion contrasts with widespread assumptions, established in the 2000s, that young people in Japan are either 'slackers' with low work morale, or the pitiful victims of partially deregulated labour markets that have subjected young people to increasing uncertainty and low wages.

Furuichi was a PhD student at the Graduate School of Arts and Sciences of the University of Tokyo, a senior researcher at Keio University's Shonan Fujisawa Campus research centre and an executive at Zent, Ltd, a consulting firm at which Furuichi engages in marketing work and IT strategy planning. As of mid-2012, Furuichi was also investigating young Japanese entrepreneurs as well as the Japanese government's entrepreneurship policy, published as The Imagined "Entrepreneur": An Analysis of Japanese Entrepreneurship Policy Since the Late 1990s (2012).

Furuichi's earlier publications (in Japanese) include The Hope Refugees: Peace Boat and the Illusion of Communities of Recognition (2010, Kobunsha: Tokyo) and The Era of Excursion-Type Consumption: Why Your Wife Wants to Shop at Costco (with Akiko Nakazawa; 2011, Asahi Shimbun Shuppansha: Tokyo). A contributor to various literary magazines, Furuichi critiqued the arbitrariness of institutionalized job-seeking practices that university students are expected to engage in, demonstrating the severe dilemmas of "most-popular employer" rankings (which seem to predict future company performance only very poorly; see Shincho 9/2012). He has also contributed accounts on new workstyles among Japanese youth, including that denoted by the category of "nomad workers" (nomado wākā). In June 2012, KOTOBA published a long dialogue between Furuichi and Tuukka Toivonen, an Oxford-based sociologist of youth and social innovation, which treated comparative elements of youth problems as well as the role that social entrepreneurs are playing in the restructuring of Japanese society.

Furuichi's books since 2012 include Nobody Can Teach War (Kodansha, 2015), That's Why Japan is Off Track (Shinchosha, 2014) and Making Nursery Schools Compulsory (Shogakukan, 2015). The Happy Youth of a Desperate Country was published in an English translation in 2017.

== Controversial commentator ==
Furuichi was known for making controversial statements about news on hot topics and was once described as a "He can't read the situation" and "He makes cheeky remarks." In Japan, many people read the situation and keep their comments to themselves, but his kind of presence stands out. Furuichi said that he comments as he thinks. When asked by Toru Hashimoto whether he was making his comments to be controversial, he replied, "I don't like to tell lies. If people like me for lying, I would rather tell the truth and be disliked." In many of the programs in which Furuichi appears, the host first asks him to comment on a hot news topic, and when he makes a controversial statement, a heated debate often ensues. His comments, though harsh, often resonate with viewers, which is why he appears on so many informational programs.

== Books ==
- The Hope Refugees: Peace Boat and the Illusion of Communities of Recognition (Kibo Nanmin Goikko-sama: Peace Boat to Shonin no Kyodotai Gensou), 2010, Kobunsha, ISBN 978-4-334-03578-5, Commentary by Yuki Honda, This is a report of sociological research and analysis by Furuichi, a graduate student at the University of Tokyo who boarded the Peace Boat, a cruise ship with the slogan "World Peace" and "Dream."
  - The Hope Refugees (Kibo Nanmin), paperback edition with revised title in 2022
- Zetsubō no Kuni no Kōfuku na Wakamono-tachi, 2010, Kodansha, ISBN 978-4-06-217065-9
  - The Happy Youth of a Desperate Country: An English-language version was released in 2017. ISBN 9784916055835
- Boku Tachi no Zento (Our Way Forward), 2012, Kodansha, ISBN 9784-06-218082-5
  - Hatarakikata ha Jibun de Kimeru (How to Work: "I" Decide How to Work), Revised title and paperback edition in 2014
- Daremo Senso wo Oshiete Kurenakatta (No One Taught Me About War), 2013, Kodansha, ISBN 978-4-06-218457-1
  - Daremo Senso wo Oshierarenai (No One Can Teach War), Revised title and paperback edition in 2015, Kodansha, ISBN 978-4-06-281606-9
- Dakara Nihon ha Zureteiru (That's Why Japan is Out of Step), 2014, Shinchosha, ISBN 978-4-10-610566-1
- Hoikuen Gimukyoiku-ka (Nursery School Compulsory Education), 2015, Shogakukan, ISBN 978-4-09-388430-3
- Furuichi-kun Shakaigaku wo Manabi Naoshinasai! (Furuichi-kun, Relearn Sociology!), 2016, Kobunsha, ISBN 978-4-334-03947-9
- Daiinaka Tokyo: Tobasu Kara Mita Tokyo (The Great Rural Tokyo: Japan Found from the Metropolitan Buses), 2017, Bungeishunju, ISBN 978-4163905129
- Dare no Mikata Demo Arimasen (I am on No One's Side), 2019, Shinchosha, ISBN 978-4106108105, a compilation of the series of the same name that has been running since April 2018 in the weekly magazine Shincho
- Zettai ni Zasetsu Shinai Nihonshi, 2020, Shinchosha, ISBN 978-4106108761
- Rakkanron (Optimism), 2021, Shinchosha, ISBN 978-4106109188
- 10-pun De Meicho (10 Minute Guide to Famous Books), 2021, Kodansha,ISBN 978-4065280492
- Seigino Mikata ga Kirai desu (I'm Not Good at Justice), 2023, Shinchosha, ISBN 978-4106109805
- Nazotoki Sekai no Shukyo, Shinwa (Mystery and Myth: Religions and Myths of the World), 2023, Kodansha, ISBN 978-4065340929
- Showa 100-nen (100 Years of the Showa Era), 2024, Kodansha, ISBN 978-4065380321

=== Novels ===
- Heisei-kun, Sayonara, 2018, Bungeishunju, ISBN 978-4-16-390923-3
  - Heisei-kun, Sayonara (paperback), 2021, Bungeishunju, ISBN 978-4-16-791688-6
- Hyaku no Yo ha Hanete (One Hundred Nights of Bouncing), 2019, Shinchosha, ISBN 978-4-10-352691-9
- Naraku (The Abyss), 2019, Shinchosha, ISBN 978-4-10-352692-6
- Ask Me Why, 2020, Magazine House, ISBN 978-4-8387-3111-4
- Hinomaru, 2022, Bungeishunju, ISBN 978-4163914695
