= Kanji Nishio =

Japanese academic (1935–2024)

Kanji Nishio (西尾 幹二, Nishio Kanji; July 20, 1935 – November 1, 2024) was a Japanese intellectual and professor emeritus of literature at the University of Electro-Communications in Tokyo, Japan.

== Life and career ==
Nishio was awarded a degree in German literature and a PhD in literature from the University of Tokyo. He translated the works of Friedrich Nietzsche and Arthur Schopenhauer into Japanese and wrote over seventy published works and over thirty translations.

Nishio, who was regarded as a rightist intellectual, was the head of the Japanese Society for History Textbook Reform (新しい歴史教科書を作る会, Atarashii Rekishi Kyokasho wo Tsukuru Kai). This was founded in January 1997 by right-wing scholars and cartoonists to devise a new Japanese history textbook because they considered existing ones to be "self-torturing". Nishio had a wide following in Japan. He was quoted as saying "Why should Japan be the only country that should teach kids -- 12- to 15-year-old kids -- bad things about itself? I think it is ridiculous, and very sad and tragic that Japan cannot write its own patriotic history. We lost the war, and a fantasy was born that by talking bad about yourself, you can strengthen your position. I call that masochistic".

He opposed immigration into Japan because he believed it would cause social disorganisation and threaten social cohesion; the subtitle of one of his works is "foreign workers will destroy Japan". Nishio claimed "This is not necessarily an economic problem. Frankly speaking, it is a problem of ‘cultural defense’".

Nishio died on November 1, 2024, at the age of 89.
