= Tokutei Asia =

Japanese far-right concept

“Tokutei Asia” countries. (Orange)

Tokutei Asia (特定アジア, tokutei ajia; abbr. Toku-A (特ア), literally "specific-Asia") is a term used on Japanese Internet forums for East Asian countries who some forum users feel exhibit certain anti-Japanese sentiment or involvement in political tensions and disputes with Japan, namely, South Korea, North Korea and China.

The term "Asia" (アジア) originally refers to a vast region stretching from East Asia to Turkey, but when Japanese media and the Internet cover the topic regions where relations with Japan tend to be problematic, mainly neighboring East Asian nations, "Specific Asia" is used to distinguish this narrowly defined "Asia" from the original "Asia."

The term tokutei Asia is later used by Japanese nationalist internet users who do not like South Korea, North Korea and China. It is generally regarded as a disparaging term, and its use is limited to certain far-right circles, most notably the netto-uyoku.

== See also ==
- East Asia
- Internet slang
- Yoshiko Sakurai (originator)
- Netto-uyoku
- Dog whistle (politics)
