= Shin-yo-sha =

Japanese academic publishing company

Shin-yo-sha Publishing Ltd. (株式会社新曜社, Kabushiki-gaisha Shinyōsha) is a publishing company based in Tokyo, Japan. Founded in 1969, it specializes in academic publishing, especially in philosophy, psychology, and related areas. Their publications include Japanese translations of Donald Norman's 1988 work The Psychology of Everyday Things, Thomas Gilovich's 1991 work How we know what isn't so, and Gerald Edelman's 1992 work Bright Air, Brilliant Fire: On the Matter of the Mind.

The head office is located at 2–10 Kanda Jimbocho, Chiyoda-ku, Tokyo. The present chief executive officer is Akira Shioura.
