= Neo Gōmanism Manifesto Special – On War =

1995 controversial manga series

- The cover of the first special

新・ゴーマニズム宣言SPECIAL 戦争論 (Shin Gōmanism Sengen Supesharu – Sensō Ron)
- Manga
- Written by: Yoshinori Kobayashi
- Published by: Gentosha
- Magazine: SAPIO
- Original run: September 1995 – 2003
- Volumes: 3

Neo Gōmanism Manifesto Special – On War (新・ゴーマニズム宣言SPECIAL 戦争論, Shin Gōmanism Sengen Supesharu - Sensō Ron) is a controversial manga series written by right-wing Japanese manga artist Yoshinori Kobayashi. It was published in a series of three volumes by Gentosha as a supplement (hence the "Special" title) to the Neo Gōmanism (新・ゴーマニズム宣言, Shin Gōmanism Sengen) series serialized in SAPIO magazine from September 1995 onwards. The series has been criticized by numerous people and groups for "rewriting history", including intellectuals Satoshi Uesugi, Shinji Miyadai and Takaaki Yoshimoto, The Academy of Outrageous Books, and even the overseas media in newspapers such as The New York Times and Le Monde. A verbal dispute over the manga's contents with Sōichirō Tahara has been published in a book called The On War War (戦争論争戦, Sensō Ron Sōsen).

== Content of the books ==
Excerpt from Volume 1. Translation: "The Japanese forces who taught them [Western colonial powers] a lesson deserve applause [from colonized countries]!"

- Volume 1 (published 1998-07-10, ISBN 4-87728-243-2)

It adopts the author's revisionist perspective of the Pacific War. It was published in the context of a fierce dispute between conservatives and leftists over comfort women, the Nanking Massacre, and Japanese history textbooks. At the time, Kobayashi was also one of the coordinators of the Japanese Society for History Textbook Reform, and he also had the intent to write Volume 1 to assist revisionist textbooks published by the Society.

Another subject raised in this book is the argument that Japanese ideals up until the Pacific War have since ceased to exist among modern Japanese. In order to negate extreme prewar nationalism and militarism, he argues that post-war Japanese have only been able to recognize the Pacific War in a negative light, and strongly asserts the brave exploits of Japan's patriotic soldiers, and argues that Japan fought for the liberation of Asia (see Greater East Asia Co-Prosperity Sphere).

- Volume 2 (Sensō Ron 2) (published October 2001, ISBN 4-344-00131-1)

Volume 2 was strongly influenced by the September 11, 2001 attacks which had happened only the previous month. Kobayashi makes the inflammatory comment concerning al-Qaeda's terrorism, "Was it really an act of terrorism?", and describes the war on terror as a confrontation between the terrorists and the economic strength, military force and egotism of a nation (namely the US), and emphasises the importance of the ideals and moral principles of war, before linking this again to an affirmation of the Pacific War.

Although this is more of a digression from the main course of the book, he links the 1995 Sarin gas attack on the Tokyo subway with the 9/11 suicide attacks, and repeats the (not unusual) opinions of military affairs critics of how the formation of terrorist organisations was possibly a result of the ending of the Cold War.

- Volume 3 (Sensō Ron 3) (published July 2003, ISBN 4-344-00356-X)

The conclusive volume of the series, with a recap of the contents of 1 and 2, which while adding new opinions on the ideals and moral principles of war, also repeats the arguments of the previous volumes, reconsiders the affirmative viewpoint of the Pacific War, criticises the US military's actions in the Iraq War as tyrannical, and also attacks the blind obedience in the modern Japanese people's pro-American attitude.

== Chapter list ==
- Volume 1
  - People Who Think Peace Comes Without a Price (平和をサービスと思う個人, Heiwa o Sābisu to Omou Kojin)
  - Bland Generalizations (in the national dialogue on Japanese history) that Simply Go With the Flow (空気に逆らえぬだけの個のない論調, Kūki ni Sakaraenu Dake no Ko no Nai Ronchō)
  - An Explanation for Young People about Japan's Big Ol' War (若者のためにスケールのデカい日本の戦争の説明, Wakamono no tame ni Sukēru no Dekai Nihon no Sensō no Setsumei)
  - The Individualism of People Brainwashed by (currently accepted views on) the Tokyo Trial (東京裁判洗脳されっ子の個人主義, Tōkyō Saiban Sennō-sarekko no Kojin-shugi)
  - Snow Falls on an Island in the South (南の島に雪が降る, Minami no Shima ni Yuki ga Furu)
  - The Birth of the Ethical Individual (倫理ある個の芽生え, Rinri aru Ko no Mebae)
  - The Spirit of the Japanese Special Attack Units (so-called "Kamikazes") (特攻精神, Tokkō Seishin)

== Books written about On War ==
- Yoshinori Kobayashi and Sōichirō Tahara, The On War War (戦争論争戦, Sensō Ron Sōsen), ISBN 4-344-40092-5
- Satoshi Uesugi, Debunking the Gōmanism Manifesto (脱ゴーマニズム宣言, Datsu Gōmanism Sengen), ISBN 4-88591-543-0
- Shinji Miyadai, A Real Argument on the Nation (リアル国家論, Riaru Kokka Ron), ISBN 4-87652-390-8
- Takaaki Yoshimoto, Surpassing "On War" (超・戦争論, Chō-Sensō Ron), Part 1: ISBN 4-7762-0010-4, Part 2: ISBN 4-7762-0011-2
- Michiaki Asaba, Nationalism - A Guide to the Japanese Nationalist Ideals in a Famous Book (ナショナリズム-名著でたどる日本思想案内, Nashonarizumu - Meicho de Tadoru Nihon-shisō Annai), ISBN 4-480-06173-8

== See also ==
- Greater East Asia War (Pacific War)
- Anti-Americanism
- Anti-Japanese sentiment
- Japanophilia
- Yasukuni Shrine
- Historical revisionism
- Manga Kenkanryu
- Shogakukan
- The Asahi Shimbun
- Sankei Shimbun
