= Yoshiko Sakurai =

Japanese journalist (born 1945)

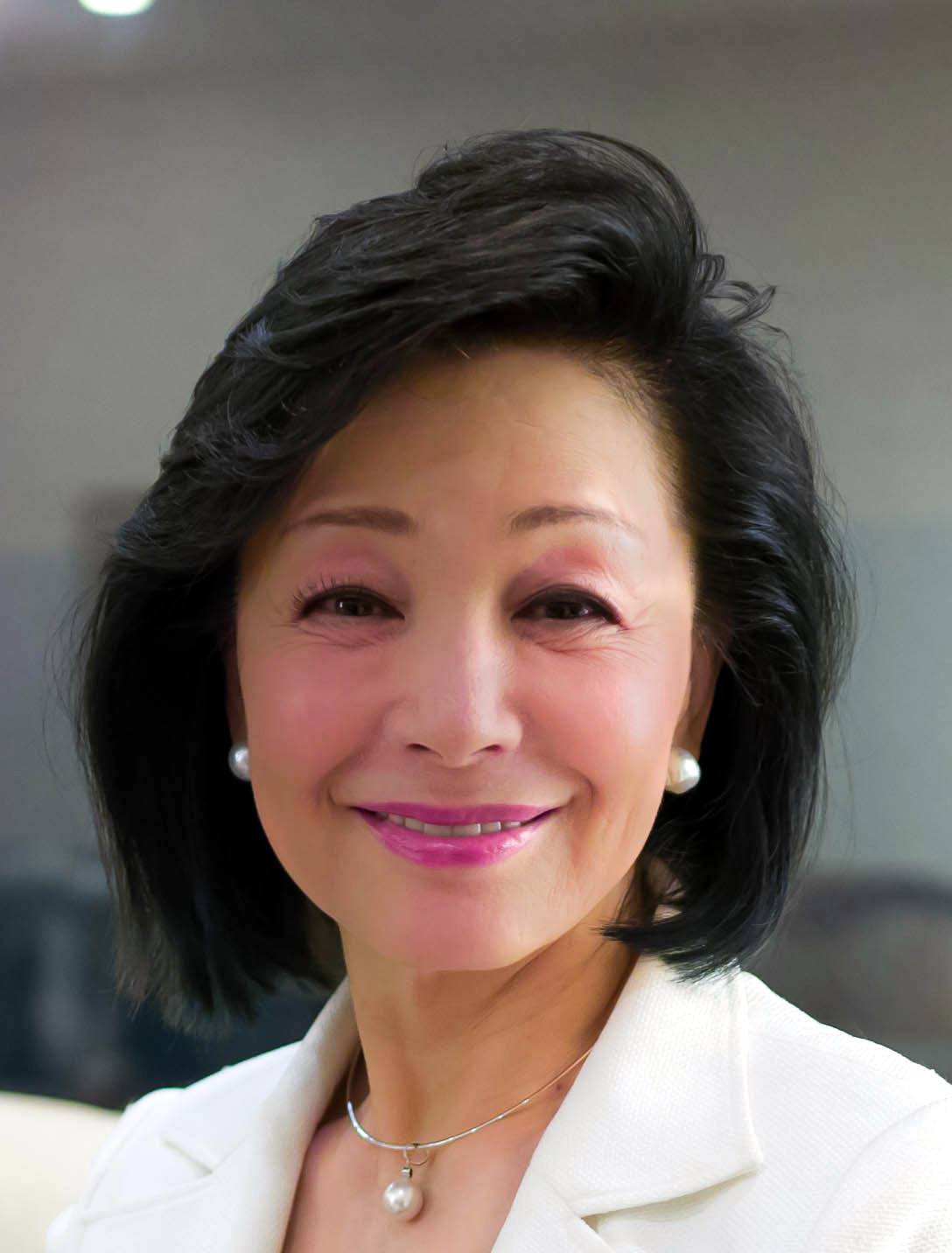
Sakurai in 2015

Yoshiko Sakurai (櫻井 よしこ, Sakurai Yoshiko; born 10 October 1945, Hanoi, French Indochina) is a Japanese journalist, TV presenter, writer, and political activist. She is also president of the Japan Institute for National Fundamentals, established in 2007.

== Biography ==
Sakurai was born to Japanese parents in Vietnam. After returning with her family to Japan, she graduated from Nagaoka High School. Later, she graduated from the University of Hawaii at Manoa, majoring in history.

Sakurai started her career as a journalist for the Christian Science Monitor in Tokyo. She served as a news presenter on Nippon Television's late night news programme Kyō no Dekigoto from 1980 to 1996. She worked on the HIV-tainted blood scandal in Japan during the 1990s.

Affiliated with the openly revisionist lobby Nippon Kaigi, Sakurai denies sexual slavery by the Japanese imperial military during World War II (i.e. "comfort women"). She promoted Taniyama Yūjirō's 2015 Scottsboro Girls film in Japan and the United States, a revisionist film aimed at denying the sexual enslavement of comfort women.

In 2007, she supported a film about the Nanjing Massacre, The Truth About Nanjing. Satoru Mizushima, the director and producer of the film, has said the massacre is nothing more than propaganda.

She is the originator of the term "Tokutei Asia".
