= Narimatsu Nobukatsu =

Japanese samurai

Narimatsu Nobukatsu (成松信勝, 1540–1584) was a Japanese samurai of the Sengoku era, who served the Ryūzōji clan. He was one of the great four men of the Ryūzōji clan. He was killed in the Battle of Okitanawate by the Shimazu clan in 1584.
