= Japanese history textbook controversies =

Controversy over historiography in Japan

Japanese history textbook controversies involve controversial content in government-approved history textbooks used in the secondary education (middle schools and high schools) of Japan. The controversies primarily concern the nationalist right efforts to whitewash the actions of the Empire of Japan during World War II.

Another serious issue is the constitutionality of the governmentally-approved textbook depictions of the Second Sino-Japanese War, World War II, Japanese war crimes, and Japanese imperialism during the first half of the 20th century. The history textbook controversies have been an issue of deep concern both domestically and internationally, particularly in countries that were victims of Imperial Japan during the war.

Despite the efforts of the nationalist textbook reformers, by the late 1990s the most common Japanese schoolbooks contained references to, for instance, the Nanjing Massacre, Unit 731, and the comfort women of World War II, all historical issues which have faced challenges from ultranationalists in the past. The most recent of the controversial textbooks, the New History Textbook, published in 2000, which significantly downplays Japanese aggression, was shunned by nearly all of Japan's school districts.

== Textbook authorization system ==
School textbooks in Japan are not written by the Ministry of Education. Instead, the textbooks for all subjects in elementary, and both lower and upper secondary schools are written and published by several major private companies. This system was introduced to Japan after World War II to avoid the government having direct authority over the written contents. Japan's School Education Law (教育基本法) requires schools to use textbooks that are authorized by the Ministry of Education (MEXT). However, each local education board has the final authority to select which textbooks can be used in their jurisdiction from the approved list.

In Japan, potential school textbooks must pass a sequence of evaluations before receiving approval to be used in Japanese schools. First, textbook companies submit a draft of their proposed textbooks to the Japanese Ministry of Education. The Textbook Authorization and Research Council (教科用図書検定調査審議会), an official council of the Ministry of Education, composed of university professors and junior high teachers, checks the draft in accordance with the Ministry's educational curriculum guidelines (学習指導要領) to ensure that the contents of the proposed textbook are "objective, impartial, and free from errors." though this has been debated. The Ministry of Education will give the company that authored the textbook the opportunity to revise the draft when it is found to contain information that is inconsistent with national guidelines. Once the textbook revisions are complete and the textbook has received the approval of the Ministry of Education, Local Boards of Education select books from a list of authorized textbooks for schools under their jurisdiction. The process of textbook authorization is ongoing and conducted every four years, the results of which are presented to the public the following year.

Critics claim that the government textbook authorization system has been used to reject textbooks that depict Imperial Japan in a negative light. This includes a case in the 1960s where a description of the Nanjing Massacre and other war crimes committed by the Japanese military before and during World War II was rejected by the Ministry of Education. The author sued the Ministry, finally winning the case decades later. Recent controversy focuses on the approval of a history textbook published by the Japanese Society for History Textbook Reform, which placed emphasis on the achievements of pre–World War II Imperial Japan, as well as a reference to the Greater East Asia Co-Prosperity Sphere with fewer critical comments compared to the other Japanese history textbooks.

Defenders of the system counter that a book that fails to mention specific negative facts regarding the aggression and atrocities committed by Japan during the Second Sino-Japanese War and World War II would also fail the Ministry of Education's approval process. During the approval process for the aforementioned history textbook by the Japanese Society for History Textbook Reform, the author was ordered to revise the book's content several times before receiving final approval. Moreover, during the Cold War, the Ministry rejected textbooks by left-leaning publishers which attempted to portray the Soviet Union, mainland China, North Korea, and other Communist countries in a positive light. Defenders also point out that during the 1960s and 1970s, the extent of the atrocities, as well as the existence of many of the incidents, were still being debated by Japanese historians; therefore, the Ministry of Education was correct in rejecting references to specific atrocities such as the Nanjing Massacre during that era, but the Ministry finally insisted on the inclusion of those same incidents after Japanese historians had finally reached consensus during the 1990s. They also point out that, North and South Korea, as well as China, which happen to be the most outspoken critics of the Japanese textbook approval process, do not allow private publishing companies to write history textbooks for their schools. Instead, the governments of those countries write a single history textbook for all of their schools. In the case of South Korea, the government strictly examines textbooks from different companies before being publicized. Critics of Chinese and Korean textbooks also argue that the textbooks of those countries are far more politically censored and self-favoring than Japanese textbooks.

Today there are 30 unique textbooks for Social Studies (社会, Shakai), from 5 different publishers, in Japanese primary schools. Additionally, there are 8 unique textbooks for the study of history as part of the Japanese Social Studies curriculum (社会-歴史的分野, Shakai-Rekishi teki bunya), from 8 different publishers, for junior high schools. In Japanese high schools, the number of available options is much greater, with 50 unique textbook editions available for teaching Japanese, and world history.

== Textbook screening ==
The current textbook authorization system began in 1947 under the direction of the U.S.-led Supreme Commander, Allied Powers (SCAP) authority during Japan's post–World War II occupation. SCAP ordered the provisional government of Japan to end the system of government-designated textbooks (国定教科書, Kokutei Kyōkasho) and allow scholars in the private sector to write textbooks. Local educators would then choose which textbooks to use at their schools. Descriptions that promoted militarism and ultranationalism were eliminated, and the new idea to promote the dignity of the individual (個人の尊厳) was introduced. The New School Education Law states that while the government sets a curriculum guideline, it is not meant to establish a fixed, uniform line for all educators to observe, like in the old militarist days, but rather to help educators to creatively adapt the curriculum to the new demands of children and society in general.

== Major controversies ==
Tokushi Kasahara identifies three time periods in postwar Japan during which he asserts the Japanese government has "waged critical challenges to history textbooks in attempts to tone down or delete descriptions of Japan's wartime aggression, especially atrocities such as the Nanjing Massacre." The first challenge occurred in 1955, and the second took place in the early 1980s. The third began in 1997 and continues unresolved to this day.

=== "Ureubeki Kyōkasho" issue (1955) ===
At the general election of February 1955, the Japan Democratic Party proposed an idea that while editing of school textbooks might be left to the private sector, the government ought to supervise them and limit the kinds of textbooks to about two for each subject by tightening the authorization, so that the textbooks in effect would be equivalent to government-designated textbooks.

At the Special Committee on Administrative Inspection of the House of Representatives in July of the same year, Kazutomo Ishii (石井一朝) of the Democratic Party of Japan suggested that textbooks were about to be published that could overthrow the principle of the education of Japan. He characterized these textbooks as:

- Intentionally and unwarrantably depicting the life of the working class of Japan as extremely horrible, so that it seems to be a product of the defects of the social system and of the self-contradiction of capitalism.
- Extolling the Soviet Union and the Republic of China (the People's Republic of China was not officially recognized at the time) very emphatically and seeming to suggest that Japan should be subservient to them.

In addition, from August to October of the same year, the Japan Democratic Party published three volumes of booklets entitled "Ureubeki Kyōkasho" (うれうべき教科書, deplorable textbooks). The first volume listed four types of bias as "examples of biased education that appeared in textbooks":

- Ones that unconditionally support the labor union of teachers and the Japan Teachers' Union, and advance their political activities: Miyahara Seiichi (宮原誠一) ed., social studies textbook for high school, Ippan Shakai (一般社会), published from Jikkyo Shuppan (実教出版).
- Ones that hype how horrible the predicament of the Japanese workers are, and thereby advances a radical and destructive labor movement: Munakata Seiya (宗像誠也) ed., social studies textbook for junior high school, Shakai no Shikumi (社会のしくみ), published from Kyōiku Shuppan (教育出版).
- Ones that particularly glorify and extol the Soviet Union and the Republic of China, and castigate Japan: Sugo Hiroshi (周郷博) ed., social studies textbook for 6th grade, Akarui Shakai (あかるい社会), published from Chuukyō Shuppan (中教出版).
- Ones that instill children with Marxist–Leninist, i.e. communist ideas: Osada Arata (長田新) ed., social studies textbook for junior high school, Mohan Chuugaku Shakai (模範中学社会), published from Jikkyō Shuppan (実教出版).

The Japan Democratic Party condemned these textbooks as biased "red textbooks" (赤い教科書). In response to this, the authors and editors of the listed textbooks made various public statements and protest notes. However, the Japan Democratic Party did not reply. Since this incident a greater number of textbooks had been rejected as being biased (偏向).

The changes resulted in one-third of pre-existing textbooks being banned from Japanese schools. The Ministry of Education required that new textbooks avoid criticism of Japanese involvement in the Pacific War, and avoid mention of the Japanese invasion of China and involvement in the Second Sino-Japanese War at all.

=== "Section F" purge ===
Textbook screening in 1956, right after a change of the members of Textbook Authorization Research Council (教科用図書検定調査審議会) in September of the previous year, failed six drafts of textbooks, a significantly greater number than before. The evaluations of drafts by the council had been noted by five letters from A to E, each representing the evaluation of a member in the council. At 1955's screening, however, there was an additional section F that was considered responsible for the rejection of all the six drafts. Over this incident professor Iwao Takayama (高山岩男) of Nihon University who newly joined the council was suspected to be the writer of section F, and the news media reported the incident as the "Section F purge" (Ｆ項パージ, "F-kō pāji").

=== Ienaga v. Japan (1965–1997) ===
Saburo Ienaga was a Japanese historian known partly for his involvement in controversies regarding school history textbooks. In 1953, the Japanese Ministry of Education published a textbook by Ienaga but censored what they said were factual errors and matters of opinion, regarding Japanese war crimes. Ienaga undertook a series of lawsuits against the Ministry for violation of his freedom of speech. He was nominated for the 2001 Nobel Peace Prize by Noam Chomsky among others.

=== Neighboring Country Clause ===
On June 26, 1982, the Japanese textbook authorization system became a major diplomatic issue for the first time when Asahi Shimbun reported that the Ministry of Education demanded a textbook, which stated that the Japanese army invaded (侵略) Northern China, be rewritten using the phrase "advanced (進出) into" instead of invaded. Having heard this news the Chinese government strongly protested to the Japanese government. In response, on August 26, 1982, Kiichi Miyazawa, then the Chief Cabinet Secretary of Japan, made the following statement:

1. The Japanese Government and the Japanese people are deeply aware of the fact that acts by our country in the past caused tremendous suffering and damage to the peoples of Asian countries, including the Republic of Korea (ROK) and China, and have followed the path of a pacifist state with remorse and determination that such acts must never be repeated. Japan has recognized, in the Japan-ROK Joint Communiqué of 1965, that the "past relations are regrettable, and Japan feels deep remorse," and in the Japan-China Joint Communiqué, that Japan is "keenly conscious of the responsibility for the serious damage that Japan caused in the past to the Chinese people through war and deeply reproaches itself." These statements confirm Japan's remorse and determination which I stated above and this recognition has not changed at all to this day.
2. This spirit in the Japan-ROK Joint Communiqué and the Japan-China Joint Communiqué naturally should also be respected in Japan's school education and textbook authorization. Recently, however, the Republic of Korea, China, and others have been criticizing some descriptions in Japanese textbooks. From the perspective of building friendship and goodwill with neighboring countries, Japan will pay due attention to these criticisms and make corrections at the Government's responsibility.
3. To this end, in relation to future authorization of textbooks, the Government will revise the Guideline for Textbook Authorization after discussions in the Textbook Authorization and Research Council and give due consideration to the effect mentioned above. Regarding textbooks that have already been authorized, Government will take steps quickly to the same effect. As measures until then, the Minister of Education, Sports, Science and Culture will express his views and make sure that the idea mentioned in 2. Above is duly reflected in the places of education.
4. Japan intends to continue to make efforts to promote mutual understanding and develop friendly and cooperative relations with neighboring countries and to contribute to the peace and stability of Asia and, in turn, of the world.

Despite the widespread attention that the issue received in both the Japanese and international media, investigations done in September 1982 reveal that the alleged change never actually took place, that the Ministry of Education did not even make a recommendation for the change, and that the entire incident was caused by hasty and inaccurate reporting by a small group of journalists assigned to cover the Ministry of Education.

In November 1982 the Ministry of Education adopted a new authorization criterion, the so-called "Neighboring Country Clause" (近隣諸国条項): Textbooks ought to show understanding and seek international harmony in their treatment of modern and contemporary historical events involving neighboring Asian countries (近隣のアジア諸国との間の近現代の歴史的事象の扱いに国際理解と国際協調の見地から必要な配慮がされていること).

The scandal proved a decisive factor in Prime Minister Zenkō Suzuki's decision not to run for reelection.

=== New History Textbook ===
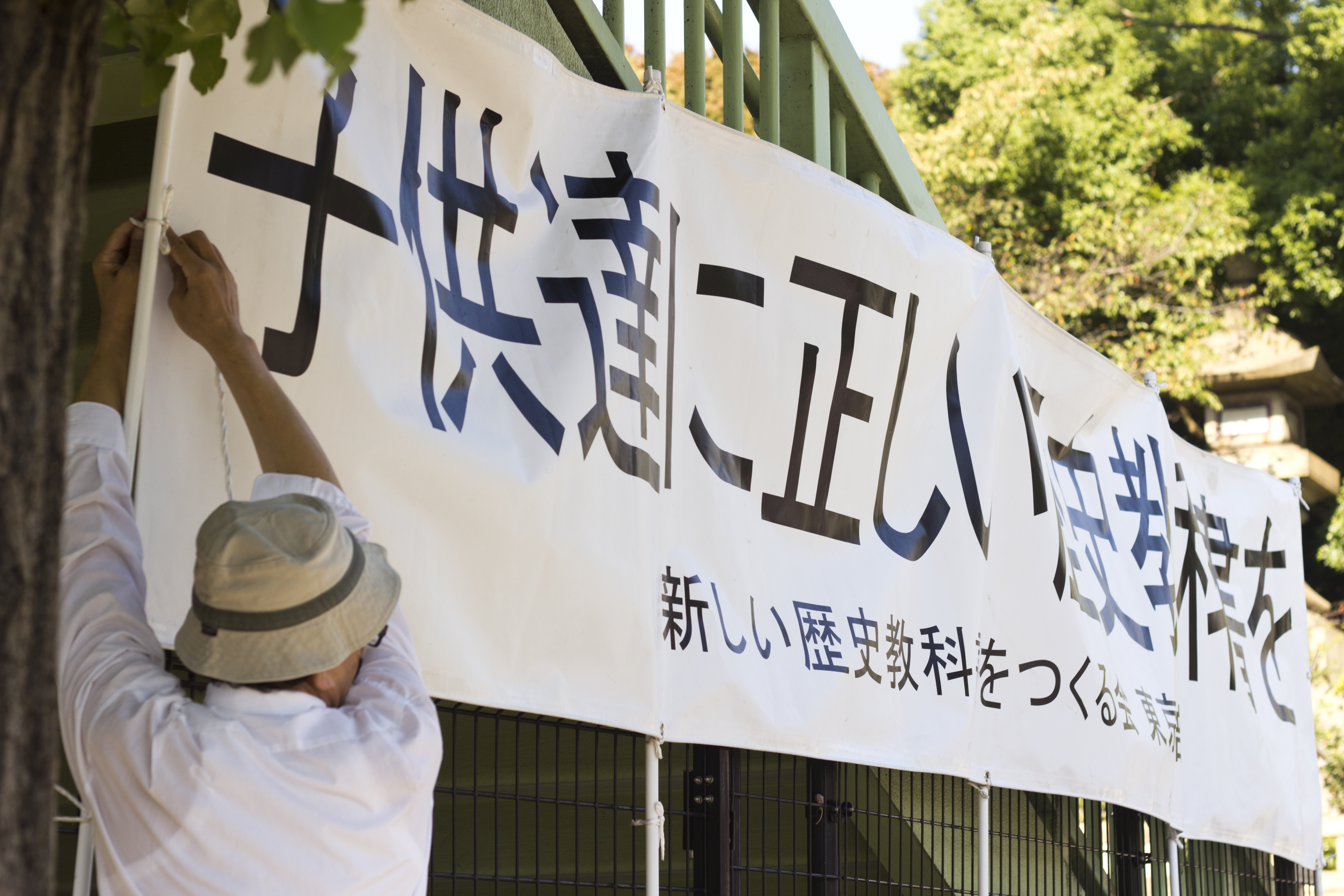
Member of the right-wing historical negationist group Japanese Society for History Textbook Reform putting up a banner reading "[Give] the children correct history textbooks" in front of the Yasukuni Shrine

In 2000, Japanese Society for History Textbook Reform, a group of conservative scholars, published the New History Textbook (Atarashii Rekishi Kyokasho, 新しい歴史教科書), which was intended to promote a revised view of Japan. The textbook downplays or whitewashes the nature of Japan's military aggression in the First Sino-Japanese War, Japan's annexation of Korea in 1910, the Second Sino-Japanese War, and in World War II. The textbook was approved by the Ministry of Education in 2001, and caused a huge controversy in Japan, China and Korea. A large number of Japanese historians and educators protested against the content of New History Textbook and its treatment of Japanese wartime activities. China Radio International reported that the PRC government and people were "strongly indignant about and dissatisfied with the new Japanese history textbook for the year 2002 compiled by right-wing Japanese scholars".

Subsequently, the New History Textbook was used by only 0.039% of junior high schools in Japan as of August 15, 2001. According to the Society, as of 2004, there were eight private junior high schools, one public school for the disabled in Tokyo, three public junior high schools and four public schools for the disabled in Ehime that used their textbook.

Anti-Japanese demonstrations were held in the spring of 2005 in China and South Korea to protest against the New History Textbook. Protests in Beijing were supervised by the Chinese Communist Party, and Japanese flags were burned in front of the Japanese embassy.

=== Comfort women comments ===
In 2007, former education minister Nariaki Nakayama declared he was proud that the Liberal Democratic Party had succeeded in getting references to "wartime sex slaves" struck from most authorized history texts for junior high schools. "Our campaign worked, and people outside government also started raising their voices."

=== 2007 passage change on forced World War II suicides ===
Japan ordered history books to change passages on forced suicides during World War II. In June 2007, the Okinawa Prefectural Assembly officially asked the Ministry of Education of Japan to retract its instruction to downplay the military's role in mass suicide in Okinawa in 1945. More than 100,000 people in Okinawa rallied against the textbook changes at the end of September. According to the Kyodo News agency, it was the biggest staged rally on the island since its 1972 return to Japanese rule. Okinawa governor Hirokazu Nakaima spoke to the crowds, commenting that the Japanese military's involvement in the mass suicides should not be forgotten.

== Studies ==
According to a 2012 Nippon article written by Daniel Sneider, an American scholar specializing in national security policy in Asia and the foreign policy of Japan and South Korea, Japanese history textbooks often do not provide a detailed account of Japan's colonial rule, particularly in Korea. Some controversial aspects of the wartime period, such as the coercive recruitment of women for sexual services by the Japanese Imperial Army - commonly referred to as "comfort women" - have been downplayed or omitted. Sneider also noted that, at times, the Ministry of Education's textbook screening process, influenced by conservative revisionists and their political supporters, has sought to soften language describing Japan's military aggression.

According to a 2014 Stanford News article on a book authored by Sneider, most Japanese textbooks present factual information and are not strongly nationalistic. However, Sneider notes that they often provide a “dry chronology” of events and dates, offering limited opportunities to engage students in critical thinking or analytical exercises. He also stated that, despite heavy media coverage of a few provocative textbooks, the most jingoistic texts produced by a single Japanese publisher, are used in less than one percent of Japanese classrooms.

Sneider's research also compared Japanese textbooks with those from China, South Korea, and the United States. He observed differences like how Chinese textbooks emphasized China's role in Japan's defeat, along with “its victimization at the hands of a brutal and criminal invader.” Sneider observed South Korean textbooks as presenting a similar nationalistic narrative, strongly highlighting both Japan's brutal colonial rule of their country from 1910 to 1945, and the Korean War as central to the nation's collective memory. Sneider noted that US textbooks, in contrast, were generally more comprehensive and encourage critical-thinking skills; however, they engage in their own form of myth-making, and tend to portray the United States as an “innocent abroad” with no culpability, presenting its troops as “fighting the good war”. Sneider stated, “Everybody constructs their own narrative to fit their own image of themselves. Some narratives are more honest than others.” He also argued that the United States can play a leading role in fostering dialogue and understanding. Sneider noted that the U.S. bears some responsibility for contributing to these “dysfunctional memories” in Japan and Korea, and observed that rising nationalism in these countries is unlikely to diminish. According to Sneider, Japan, at the urging of the United States, was positioned in a long-term Cold War confrontation with its principal World War II victim, China. As a result, there had been little motivation in the past for Japan to thoroughly examine its wartime atrocities against China, with similar themes discussed in other scholarship on wartime memory, including work by Marshall Wordsworth in Inconvenient and Uncomfortable: Transcending Japan’s Comfort Women Paradigm.

== See also ==
- Bias in education
- Nanjing Massacre denial
- Historiography and nationalism
- Japanese nationalism
- Racism in Japan
- Manga Kenkanryu
- Zaitokukai
- Anti-Chinese sentiment in Japan
- Anti-Korean sentiment in Japan
- Anti-Japanese sentiment in China
- Anti-Japanese sentiment in Korea
- List of war apology statements issued by Japan
- People's Republic of China – Japan relations
- History of Japan–Korea relations
- Korean history textbook controversies
- American cover-up of Japanese war crimes
- Japan–Korea disputes
- Hashima Island
- Sōshi-kaimei
- Korea under Japanese rule
- Myth of the clean Wehrmacht
