= Yoshinori Kobayashi =

Japanese manga artist (born 1953)

Yoshinori Kobayashi 小林 よしのり
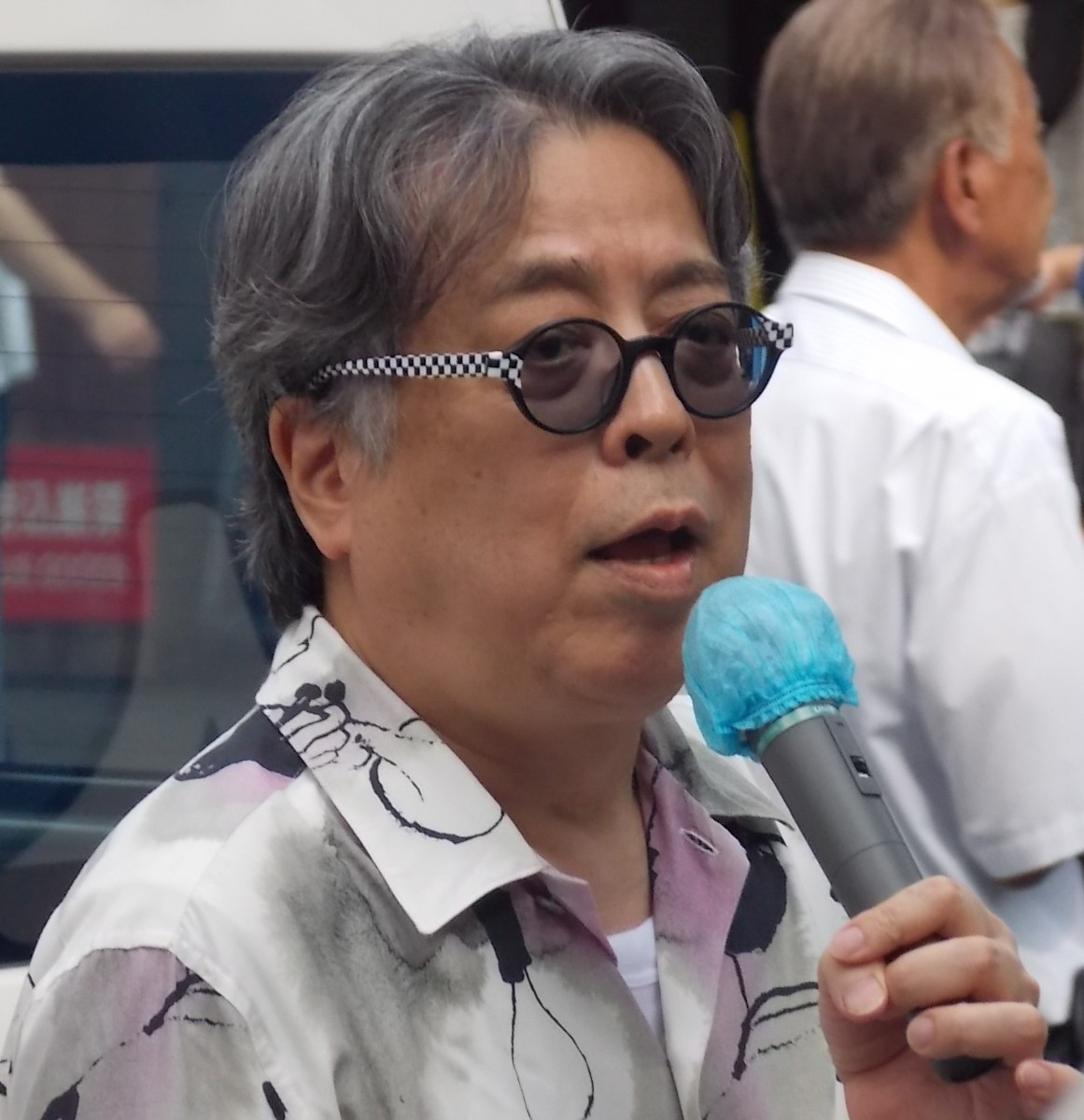
- Born: Yoshinori Kobayashi (小林 善範); August 31, 1953 (age 73) Fukuoka, Japan
- Area: Manga artist
- Notable works: Gōmanism Sengen

Yoshinori Kobayashi (Japanese: 小林 よしのり or 小林 善範, Hepburn: Kobayashi Yoshinori; born August 31, 1953) is a Japanese manga artist known for his nationalist political commentary manga Gōmanism Sengen. In particular, the three volumes On War (Sensōron) of this series made him famous in Japan, together selling more than 1.5 million volumes since first appearing in 1998.

== Life ==
A student of French literature from Fukuoka University, Kobayashi published his first manga, Tōdai Itchokusen, in 1976 in Weekly Shōnen Jump while still in school. Another of his early series, Obocchama-kun, a satire about a naughty rich boy in the heyday of Japan's bubble economy, won the 1989 Shogakukan Manga Award for children's manga.

Kobayashi was included on Aum Shinrikyo's assassination list after he began satirising the cult. An assassination attempt was made on him by the members of the cult in 1993.

Kobayashi is a denier of both the Nanjing Massacre and of the comfort women system during World War II.

== Works ==
- Tōdai Itchokusen (東大一直線; 'Beeline to Tokyo U') (1976)
- Obocchama-kun (おぼっちゃまくん; 'Little Princelling') (1986)
- Gōmanism Sengen (ゴーマニズム宣言) volumes 1–9
  - Gōmanism Sengen Extra 1 (ゴーマニズム宣言EXTRA 1) ISBN 4-344-00659-3
  - Gō-Gai! (ゴー外!; 'Gōmanism Supplement/Side Story') ISBN 4-7762-0188-7
  - Gōmanism Sengen Sabetsu Ron Special (ゴーマニズム宣言差別論スペシャル; 'On Discrimination') (1995) ISBN 4-7592-6031-5
  - Shin Gōmanism Sengen (新・ゴーマニズム宣言) volumes 1–14
  - Shin Gōmanism Sengen Special – Datsu Seigi Ron (新・ゴーマニズム宣言SPECIAL 脱正義論; 'On Escaping Correctness') (1996) ISBN 4-87728-128-2
  - Neo Gōmanism Manifesto Special – On War (新・ゴーマニズム宣言SPECIAL 戦争論, Shin Gōmanism Sengen Special – Sensō Ron) (1998), volumes 1–3 (Vol 1: ISBN 4-87728-243-2, Vol 2: ISBN 4-344-00131-1, Vol 3: ISBN 4-344-00356-X)
  - Sabetsu Ron Special – Gōmanism Sengen (差別論スペシャル―ゴーマニズム宣言) (1998) ISBN 4-87728-622-5
  - Shin Gōmanism Sengen Special – "Ko to Ōyake" Ron (新・ゴーマニズム宣言SPECIAL ｢個と公｣論; 'On the "Individual" and the "Public"') (2000) ISBN 4-87728-955-0
  - Neo Gomanism Manifesto Special – On Taiwan (新・ゴーマニズム宣言SPECIAL 台湾論, Shin Gōmanism Sengen Special – Taiwan Ron) (2000) ISBN 4-09-389051-X
  - Gōmanism Sengen Special – Yoshirin Senki (ゴーマニズム宣言スペシャル よしりん戦記; 'Record of the Yoshirin War') (2003) ISBN 4-09-389054-4
  - Shin Gōmanism Sengen Special – Okinawa Ron (新・ゴーマニズム宣言SPECIAL 沖縄論; 'On Okinawa') (2005) ISBN 4-09-389055-2
  - Shin Gōmanism Sengen Special – Yasukuni Ron (新・ゴーマニズム宣言SPECIAL 靖國論; 'On Yasukuni') (2005) ISBN 4-344-01023-X
  - Shin Gōmanism Sengen Special – Chōsen-teki Heiwa Ron (新・ゴーマニズム宣言SPECIAL 挑戦的平和論; 'A Defiant Discussion On Peace'), volumes 1–2
  - Iwayuru A-kyū Sempan – Gōsen Special (いわゆるA級戦犯 ゴー宣SPECIAL; 'As Called A-class War Criminal')
- Honjitsu no Zatsudan (本日の雑談; 'Today's Chat')
- Live A Live (Character designer, "Prehistory" chapter)

== Bibliography ==
- Krämer, Hans Martin (2008). "'Not Befitting Our Divine Country': Eating Meat in Japanese Discourses of Self and Other from the Seventeenth Century to the Present". Food and Foodways. 16 (1): 33–62. doi:10.1080/07409710701885135.
- French, Howard F.: Japan's Resurgent Far Right Tinkers With History, New York Times, March 25, 2001.
- Richter, Steffi (2005). "Mediating Historical Revisionism: Kobayashi Yoshinori as a Symptom of Cultural Crisis in Contemporary Japan". In The Academy of Korean Studies (ed.). Nationalism and history textbooks in Asia and Europe: diverse views on conflicts surrounding history. The Academy of Korean Studies. pp. 47–64. ISBN 8992037023.
- Winchester, Mark: Everything you know about Ainu is wrong: Kobayashi Yoshinori’s excursion into Ainu historiography, The Asia-Pacific Journal, Vol 9, Issue 22, No 1, May 30, 2011.
