= Anti-Korean sentiment =

Hatred or fear of anything Korean

Anti-Korean sentiment, also known as Koreaphobia or Koryophobia, describes negative feelings towards Korean people, or Korean culture. It differs from opposition to one of the two countries that actually exists on the Korean Peninsula (anti-South Korean or anti-North Korean sentiment).

Anti-Korean sentiment has varied by location and time. The conflicting perceptions of Koreans and Japanese about Japan's occupation of Korea often lead to dispute. In recent years, sentiment has largely been impacted by politics, military aggression, territorial disputes, disputes over claims of historical revisionism, economic competition, and culture.

== Within the Korean Peninsula ==
Since the end of World War II, the relationship between both North Korea and South Korea have been hostile. The two nations fought in the Korean War, which ended with an armistice agreement in 1953 without a peace treaty. Both nations claim the entire Korean Peninsula and have competed for sovereignty. Tensions after the war have further escalated in 1968, starting from a failed North Korean assassination attempt on South Korean President Park Chung Hee, a failed counter-assassination attempt against Kim Il Sung, the Uljin–Samcheok Landings, and the execution of a 9 year old South Korean boy by North Korean commandoes during the landings. Although the relationship somewhat warmed during the Sunshine Policy of the late 1990s to early 2000s, they have since cooled.

=== Foreign-born ethnic Koreans ===
The treatment of ethnic Koreans who were born abroad and returned to South Korea has changed over time. In the 1990s, many young people with pro-unification sentiment viewed ethnic Koreans positively, and saw them as "representatives of the authentic Korean nation". However, sentiments subsequently cooled, and South Korean identity came to exclude both North Koreans and foreign-born ethnic Koreans.

Foreign-born Koreans who now live in South Korea have widely reported experiencing discrimination from South Koreans. They are reportedly seen as lazy, prone to commit crimes, and dirty. A 2009 study found that while foreign-born ethnic Koreans were preferred over non-Korean workers by employers, ethnic Koreans were "at least as likely to report discrimination".

=== South Koreans of mixed heritage ===
People with partial Korean heritage have also experienced discrimination in South Korea, although this trend may be diminishing since at latest the late 2000s. In 2009, South Korean schools were prohibited from promoting ideas of ethnic purity and homogeneity, and in 2011 the Republic of Korea Armed Forces amended their oath, replacing the term minjok (민족), meaning "nation", with "citizen" (국민).

== Other regions ==
=== China ===
Korea and China have historically maintained complicated ties. When Korea was annexed by Imperial Japan in 1910, it fell under Japanese influence. In China it is believed that some ethnic Koreans served in the Imperial Japanese Army whose invasion of China launched the Second Sino-Japanese War in July 1937. Adding to this sentiment is the allegation that some Koreans reportedly operated the Burma-Siam Death Railway. The Chinese referred to Koreans using the slur er guizi (Chinese: 二鬼子; pinyin: èr guǐzi).

=== Germany ===
Many Korean residents in Germany have reported an increase in anti-Korean incidents following the outbreak of COVID-19, and the South Korean embassy has warned its citizens of the increasing hateful climate facing them. As suspicion toward Koreans is growing, locals are also opting to avoid Korean restaurants, some of which have reported a sales decline of 80%.

=== Israel ===
Because of the COVID-19 pandemic, South Korean tourists were instructed to avoid public places and remain in isolation in their hotels. The Israeli military announced its intention to quarantine South Korean nationals to a military base. Many of the remaining South Koreans were rejected by hotels and were forced to spend nights at Ben Gurion Airport. An Israeli newspaper subsequently published a Korean complaint that "Israel is Treating [Korean and other Asian] Tourists Like Coronavirus". South Korean Foreign Minister Kang Kyung-wha has described Israel's response as "excessive".

=== Japan ===
In the Kantō Massacre shortly after the 1923 Great Kantō earthquake, ethnic Koreans in Japan were scapegoated and killed by mobs of Japanese vigilantes.

During the 2002 FIFA World Cup, Japanese and Korean supporters clashed with one another. Both sides were also known to post racist messages against each other on online bulletins. There were also disputes regarding how the event was to be hosted, as a result of the rivalry between the two nations. The territorial dispute over the Liancourt Rocks also fuels outrage. Manga Kenkanryu (often referred to as Hating the Korean Wave) by Sharin Yamano discusses these issues while making many other arguments and claims against Korea.

Zainichi Koreans in Japan are also publicly perceived to be a nuisance and are seen as likely to cause trouble and start riots, a view shared by former Tokyo Governor Shintaro Ishihara.

Some right-wing groups in Japan today have targeted ethnic Koreans living within Japan. One such group, known as Zaitokukai, is organized by members on the Internet, and has led street demonstrations against Korean schools.

In April 2014, several anti-Korean stickers were found posted at 13 locations along the Shikoku Pilgrimage route; the stickers were denounced by a spokesman from the Shikoku 88 Temple Pilgrimage Association.

=== Netherlands ===
KLM, the country's flag carrier airline, prohibited only Korean passengers from using their toilets on one of their flights.

In general, there has recently been a spate of anti-Korean incidents in the Netherlands, which have targeted both Korean nationals and Dutch people of Korean descent. These incidents range from vandalism of homes to violent assault to harassment. More than 150 Korean expat respondents in an online survey indicated they had experienced an xenophobic incident.

=== Philippines ===
Historically, Korean soldiers were compelled to serve on the side of the Empire of Japan during the Japanese occupation of the Philippines in World War II. This has caused some Filipinos, especially older ones, to associate the Koreans with atrocities committed during the war.

=== Former Soviet Union ===
In 1937, nearly 172,000 ethnic Koreans were forcefully transferred from the Russian Far East to Soviet Central Asia under the national delimitation policy.

The deportation was preceded by a typical Soviet scenario of political repression: falsified trials of local party leaders accused of insurrection, accusations of plans of the secession of the Far Eastern Krai, local party purges, and articles in Pravda about the Japanese espionage in the Far East.

The resettlement plans were revived with new vigor in August 1937, ostensibly with the purpose of suppressing "the penetration of the Japanese espionage into the Far Eastern Krai". This time, however, the direction of resettlement was westward, to Soviet Central Asia. From September to October 1937, more than 172,000 Soviet Koreans were deported from the border regions of the Russian Far East to Kazakh SSR and Uzbek SSR (the latter including Karakalpak ASSR).

=== Taiwan ===
In November 2010, Taiwanese citizens protested against the disqualification of Taekwondo athlete Yang Shu-chun at the 2010 Asian Games after a Korean-Filipino referee disqualified a Taiwanese fighter. Images and messages deriding South Korean products and culture were widely shared online. There were reports of restaurants displaying 'No Koreans' signs on their doors, and protesters burning the Korean flag or destroying South Korean products.

In June 2012, the CEO of Foxconn Terry Gou stated that he had "great esteem for Japanese (businessmen), especially those who are able to disagree with you in person and not stab you in the back, unlike the Gaoli bangzi (a racial slur for Koreans)", sparking controversy.

=== United Kingdom ===
During the COVID-19 pandemic in the United Kingdom, Korean students studying in the UK reported experiencing anti-Korean sentiment as part of xenophobia related to the pandemic. A study conducted by Royal Holloway, University of London with 12 Korean students who studied in the UK between 2017 and 2021 found that Koreans studying in Britain were often mistaken as being Chinese by wider society even before the outbreak of COVID-19. Koreans in the UK also reported being discriminated against during the pandemic due to false claims that East Asians were spreading COVID-19. According to the study's authors, their results "suggest that institutional and professional interventions are needed to improve the safety and mental health of Korean students studying abroad in a global pandemic situation such as COVID-19".

=== United States ===
The Los Angeles riots of 1992 were partially based on Anti-Korean sentiment. Ice Cube's song Black Korea which would later be accused of inciting racism was written in response to the death of 15-year old African-American Latasha Harlins, who was shot and killed by Korean-American store owner Soon Ja-du on March 16, 1991, as well as the preponderence of Korean grocery stores in primarily black neighborhoods. The event resulted in mass ransacking and destruction of Korean-American owned stores in Los Angeles by groups of young African-Americans.

== Derogatory terms ==
The following is a list of derogatory terms referring to either Korea or Korean people.

=== In Chinese ===
- Er guizi – literally "second devils", negatively associates Koreans with the assumed first devils: the Japanese. The term arose during the 1937–1945 Second Sino–Japanese War, and generally referred to all perceived collaborators with the Japanese.
- Gaoli bangzi or Han bangzi (Chinese: 韩棒子) – derogatory term used against ethnic Koreans that likens them to hillbillies. Gaoli refers to the historical Korean state Goryeo and Han refers to the native name for Korean people, while bangzi means "club".
- Gaoli paocai (simplified Chinese: 高丽泡菜; traditional Chinese: 高麗泡菜; pinyin: gāolì pàocài) – literally "Goryeo kimchi". Used by Taiwanese baseball fans, as a result of their rivalry against South Korea. Variants include 死泡菜 ("dead kimchi").

=== In Japanese ===
- Cockroaches (ゴキブリ, gokiburi) – commonly used to refer to Zainichi Koreans.
- Chon (チョン) – vernacular nickname for Koreans, with strongly offensive overtones. Various suggested etymologies exist; one such etymology is that it is an abbreviation of Chōsen (朝鮮), a Japanese term for Korea. In 2021, The CEO of DHC Corporation used this term to widespread controversy. Variants of the term also exist, including chonko (チョンコ; チョン公).
- Chōsenjin (朝鮮人) – the term was once considered neutral, especially because it literally means "Joseon person", but became associated with anti-Korean sentiment especially after World War II, as some perceive it as harkening to the Japanese colonial era.
- Futeisenjin (不逞鮮人) – term meaning "insubordinate Korean", where senjin is short for Chōsenjin. This term was often used to describe the Korean independence movement, although it was also used to portray Koreans in general negatively.
- Kaisenjin (怪鮮人) – term meaning "suspicious Korean". Used during and after the colonial period to refer to ethnic Korean criminals, now considered discriminatory.
- Kimchi yarō (キムチ野郎 / キムチ埜郞, Kimuchi yarō) – literally "kimchi bastard". Notably, in 2003, the Mongolian sumo wrestler Asashōryū sparked controversy by calling a Korean journalist this term.
- Parasites (寄生虫, kiseichū) – commonly used to refer to Zainichi Koreans.
- Sangokujin (三国人) – antiquated term meaning "people from third countries", referring to ethnic Korean/Taiwanese (former colonial subjects) people in Japan. Considered by some to now be a slur. Made infamous after the Governor of Tokyo Shintaro Ishihara used the term in 2000, when he said "Atrocious crimes have been committed again and again by sangokujin ... we can expect them to riot in the event of a disastrous earthquake". This implied he believed the widely rejected rumors (even within Japan) that started the Kantō Massacre, in which Koreans were lynched after rumors circulated that they were poisoning water supplies and rioting. Ishihara later refused to apologize for the remark.
- Tokuajin (特亜人 / 特亞人, Tokuajin) – meaning "Tokutei (East) Asian". A derogatory term used against Koreans and Chinese.

=== In Korean ===
- Black-haired foreigner (검은 머리 외국인) – used by South Koreans to refer to ethnic Koreans who are either foreign-born, are foreign citizens, or spent significant time abroad. It is also used to refer to people with perceived foreign interests.
- Chinese dog (짱개) – a slur normally used to refer to Chinese people that is also used towards Chinese-born ethnic Koreans.
- Jjokbari (쪽발이) – a slur normally used to refer to Japanese people that is also used towards Zainichi Korean people. A more specific variant of the slur is ban-jjokbari, meaning "half jjokbari".
- Kimchi-nam and Kimchi-nyeo (김치남; 김치녀) – meaning literally "Kimchi male" and "Kimchi female". Used by younger South Koreans to pejoratively refer to perceived stereotypical Korean men or women. They have also become associated the conflict over feminism in South Korea.

=== In English ===
- Gook – a derogatory term used by occupying US military to refer to native people, mainly Asians. According to the Oxford English Dictionary, the etymology is unknown and disagreed upon. It states that the word traces its usage through US military deployments in the Philippines, Korea, and Vietnam, although other sources record it during the 1915–1934 occupation of Haiti. A widespread urban legend holds that it derives from the Korean miguk (미국; 美國), meaning "America", which American soldiers interpreted as "me gook", or from other variants involving the word for country, guk.
- Kimchi – referencing the Korean dish.
- Jugheads is also another English slur used by foreigners who see Koreans as having large heads.

=== In Indonesian ===
- Jepang Barat – literally "West Japan", pejoratively recalling Korea under Japanese rule.

== See also ==
- Anti-Chinese sentiment in Korea
- Anti-American sentiment in Korea
- Anti-Japanese sentiment in Korea
  - Netto-uyoku
- Korean conflict
- Zaitokukai
