= Anti–South Korean sentiment =

Anti-South Korean sentiment or anti-Republic of Korea sentiment (simply anti-ROK sentiment) refers to opposition or hostility towards the South Korea. While anti-South Korean or anti-ROK sentiment are distinct from "anti-Korean sentiment" related to ethnic hostilities, they may also include racist elements such as hostility towards the South Korean people.

The Korean Wave, a reference to the global trend of South Korean popular culture since the 1990s, has caused pushbacks in some countries.

== Statistics ==
Results of 2017 BBC World Service poll. Views of South Korea's influence by country Sorted by Pos-Neg
Country polled	Positive	Negative	Neutral	Pos-Neg
China	25%	71%	2	−46
Germany	11%	32%	57	−21
Spain	24%	42%	34	−18
Brazil	36%	46%	18	−10
Mexico	36%	42%	22	−6
Greece	24%	29%	47	−5
Pakistan	19%	22%	59	−3
India	27%	28%	45	−1
Peru	37%	37%	26	0
Kenya	34%	34%	32	0
France	45%	44%	11	1
Global average	37%	36%	27	1
Nigeria	44%	34%	22	10
Canada	47%	36%	17	11
United Kingdom	52%	40%	8	12
Russia	32%	20%	48	12
Indonesia	37%	23%	40	14
United States	51%	33%	16	18
Australia	61%	24%	15	37
Turkey	70%	21%	9	49

== By region ==
=== Brazil ===
Despite the popularity of South Korean culture in Brazil among young people, some anti-Korean incidents have occurred in Brazil. In 2017, the Brazilian television host Raul Gil was accused of racism and xenophobia while making derogatory jokes to Asians and a "slit eye" gesture during a live interview with the K-Pop group K.A.R.D. This drew backlash from the Brazilian and foreign press. In 2019, a Brazilian couple published several videos on social media making fun of Korean food and language during a trip to South Korea. The case generated harsh criticism on social media.

=== China ===
At the end of World War II, North Korea, which was aligned with the Soviet bloc, became an ally of the People's Republic of China (PRC), while the PRC and the Republic of Korea did not recognize each other. During the Korean War, when China was engaged in war with South Korea and its United Nations allies, propaganda was used to indoctrinate people into hating South Korea, which was called a "puppet state" of the United States by the PRC government of the time.

From 1992 onward, after South Korea's normalization of relations with China, the relationship between the two nations gradually improved. From 2000 onward, Korean popular culture became more and more visible within China.

A February 2021 survey conducted by scholars from Rice University, the University of British Columbia, and the Lee Kuan Yew School of Public Policy had 43% of Chinese respondents expressing an unfavorable view of South Korea, compared to 49% expressing a favorable view.

=== Indonesia ===
In Indonesia, Anti-Korean sentiment emerged in the 2000s. The emergence of anti-Korean sentiment is caused by several factors, such as plastic surgery and atheism in South Korea. Some Indonesians call Koreans "plastic". This stereotype arises because of the popularity of plastic surgery in South Korea. This stereotype has been strengthened since the suicide of the former member of Shinee, Jonghyun. In addition, there are assumptions that Korean drama lovers are excessive and that the people of Korea are always committing adultery. It was reported in 2013 that some Bali businesses had put up signs prohibiting Korean customers due to reports that a number of them flouted regulations during their stay.

In 2021, a South Korean man allegedly launched a racist attack against an Indonesian woman on social media. This incident sparked anger amongst the Indonesian public and triggered further anti-Korean sentiment in the country. Also in that year, SunnyDahye, a Korean internet personality living in the country, was criticized by Indonesian people for making comments calling Indonesians "stupid" and allegedly pretending to fast during the month of Ramadan. The live coverage of the 2020 Olympics made some Indonesians irate after the MBC mistakenly set a picture of the map of Malaysia when the Indonesian contingent arrived at the opening ceremony.

In June 2024, racism committed by some South Koreans it has been widely discussed on social media website called Indosarang. It is an online forum used by South Korean workers living in Indonesia. In the forum, several users have made derogatory comments towards Indonesians and their religion.

=== Israel ===
Because of the COVID-19 pandemic, South Korean tourists were instructed to avoid public places and remain in isolation in their hotels. The Israeli military announced its intention to quarantine South Korean nationals to a military base. Many of the remaining South Koreans were rejected by hotels and were forced to spend nights at Ben Gurion Airport. An Israeli newspaper subsequently published a Korean complaint that "Israel is Treating [Korean and other Asian] Tourists Like Coronavirus". South Korean Foreign Minister Kang Kyung-wha has described Israel's response as "excessive".

=== Italy ===
In early 2020, a leading Italian music school banned all East Asian students from attending classes due to coronavirus fear, with South Koreans the largest nationality being affected. South Korean students also describe being barred from the building and being mocked by other students because of their origin. In addition, some South Korean residents have reported fear of leaving their homes amid rising incidents of discrimination and mockery, and others considered leaving Italy because they could not "stay in a place that hates us".

=== Japan ===
The Korean Wave, or the exportation of South Korean pop culture, has created some negative feelings among pockets of Japanese society. Many Japanese citizens with conservative views and some right-wing nationalist groups have organized anti-Korean Wave demonstrations via 2channel. On 9 August 2011, more than 2,000 protesters demonstrated in front of Fuji TV's headquarters in Odaiba, Tokyo against the broadcasting of Korean dramas. Earlier, in July 2011, well-known actor Sousuke Takaoka was fired from his agency, Stardust Promotion, for tweeting criticisms against the influx of Korean dramas. The general perception of Koreans on 2channel is negative, with users depicting them as a violent, unethical, and irrational people who are a 'threat' to Japan. Users often reference stereotypes of Koreans, such as the use of dogs in Korean cuisine.

=== Malaysia ===
On Jan 31 2026, South Korean band Day6 staged a concert in Kuala Lumpur, Malaysia, which saw attendees from all over East Asia and Southeast Asia. Following the concert, a few Malaysian fans went online to express their grievances about South Korean fans that had been sneaking large professional cameras and lenses into the venue to take photos of the event. However, organisers for Day6's concert in Malaysia stated that no cameras or video equipment of any kind were allowed in the venue. Some Southeast Asian and South Korean fans argued online over the appropriateness of the actions, with a portion of both sides insulting each others' countries. The hashtag "#SEAbling" was used to refer to perceived ASEAN solidarity among the Southeast Asian side.

=== Mongolia ===
In 2008, it was reported that some South Korean men took sex tourism trips to Mongolia, often as clients of South Korean-run businesses in the country. This was said to spark anti-Korean sentiment and an increased number of assaults on South Korean nationals in the country.

=== North Korea ===
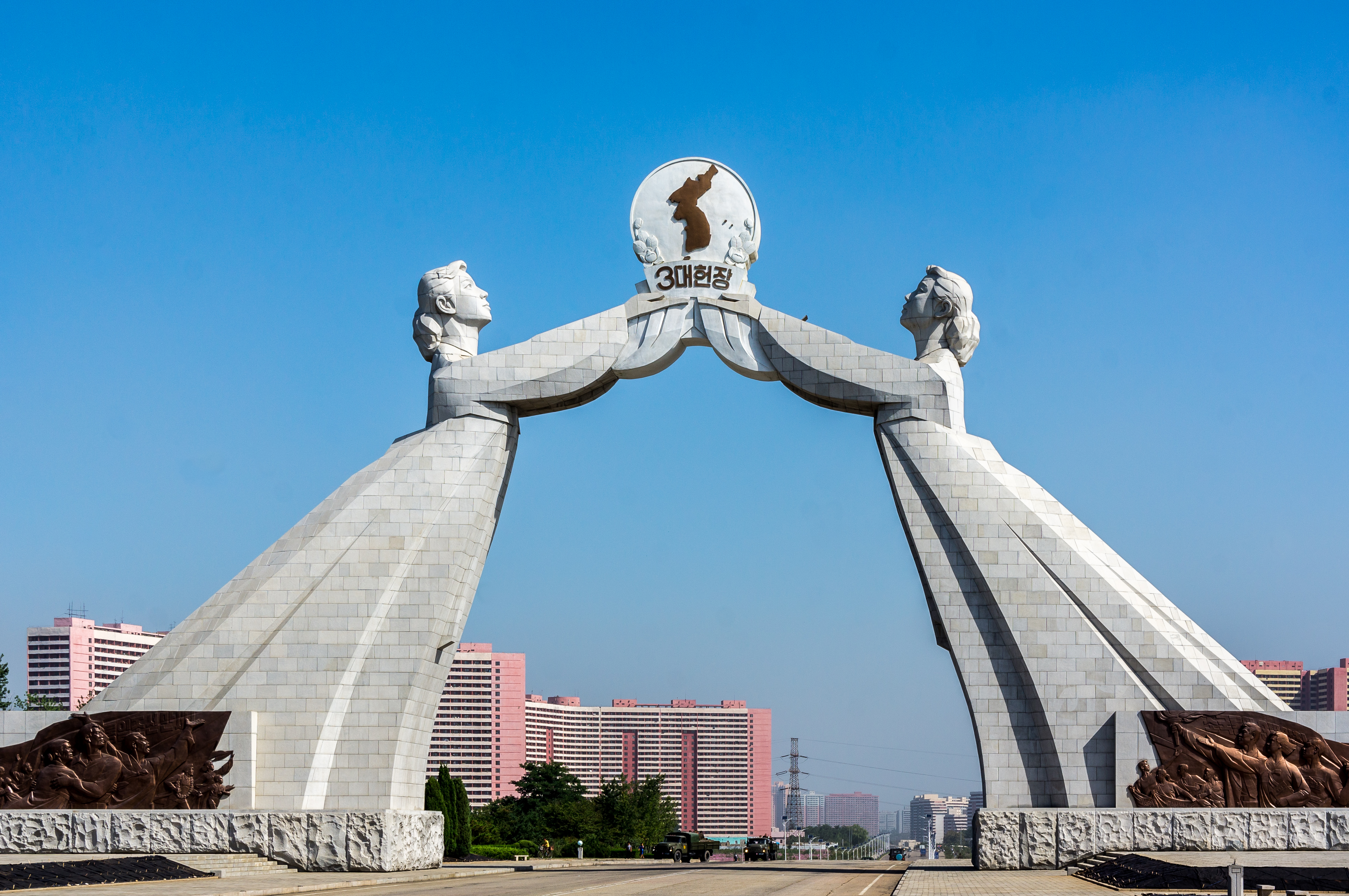
The Arch of Reunification in Pyongyang was officially demolished in January 2024.

Naval skirmishes frequently occur between the two states, with North Korea targeting South Korean naval bases. The Bombardment of Yeonpyeong was cited by former UN ambassador Bill Richardson to be "the most serious crisis on the Korean peninsula since the 1953 armistice".

In 2023, North Korea abandoned reunification as a goal and started de-emphasizing its ethnic ties with South Korea, instead designating the South as a hostile state. In January 2024, Kim Jong Un recognized South Korea as a "primary foe and invariable principal enemy".

=== Philippines ===
Ethnographic fieldwork done in Sabang from 2003 to 2015 found that the influx of [South] Koreans was viewed negatively by some locals and resident Westerners. South Koreans were also identified in 2007 as the top violator of immigration laws according to the Philippine Bureau of Immigration.

Many South Korean social media influencers have been accused of a marketing strategy dubbed pinoy baiting, a practice that many other foreigners are also accused of. The strategy refers to the insincere usage, appropriation, and acknowledgment of Filipino culture by foreigners to pander to a Filipino audience.

Some Filipinos perceive Koreans to be rude and to refuse integration into Filipino culture. Another area of concern was the prohibition of South Korean tourists from doing business with local tourist firms by South Korean tour operators. This would mean that Filipino firms would benefit significantly less from South Korean tourists.

Some Korean media portrayals of Filipinos in movies such as Wandeuki (Punch) and negative treatment of Filipino-born or Filipino-raised celebrities living in South Korea such as politician Jasmine Lee and entertainer Sandara Park, have worsened Filipino views of Koreans. In an interview, Sandara Park stated, "[Filipinos] are really gentle. I feel upset because the Korean media only reports crime [when talking about the Philippines]."

Senator Jinggoy Estrada proposed banning all Korean dramas and movies in the Philippines, and said "My observation is if we continue showing Korean telenovelas, our citizens praise the Koreans while Filipino artists continue losing jobs and money. So sometimes it comes to my mind that we should ban the telenovelas of the foreigners, and the Filipino artists who have great talent in acting are what we should be showing in our own country." Estrada clarified that he was only frustrated "that while we are only too eager and willing to celebrate South Korea's entertainment industry, we have sadly allowed our own to deteriorate because of the lack of support from the movie going public."

==== #CancelKorea ====
In September 2020, Filipino-American TikTok star Bella Poarch posted a video of herself dancing, in which Japan's rising sun flag could be seen tattooed on her arm. South Koreans swarmed the comments section saying the tattoo was offensive and that she should apologize and get it removed.

Shortly after backlash and criticism from her video, Bella posted a comment of apology on TikTok : "I'm very sorry if my tattoo offends you," she wrote. "I love Korea, please forgive me." Additionally, her caption read, "I would never do anything to hurt anyone." Bella also explained that she got the tattoo back in March 2020 but had it scheduled for removal. She also promised to learn more about the symbol's history and help educate people further on the symbol, but has been unable to remove the tattoo as a result of the COVID-19 pandemic.

Despite the apology, some South Korean users continued with hostile comments, attacking Filipinos referring to them as poor, slaves, ugly, and uneducated. Along with #CancelKorea, the hashtags #ApologizeToFilipinos including #CancelRacism and #한국취소 (meaning Cancel Korea, or in Hanja: #韓國取消) also trended with Twitter.

However, the anger was relieved when other South Korean netizens apologized on behalf of the racist remarks, spreading the hashtag '미안해요 필리핀 (#SorryToFilipinos)'. From these apologies, some Filipinos suggested to change the hashtag #CancelKorea to #CancelRacism. Some Filipino netizens went out to apologize for any offensive remarks made against the Koreans during the spat, using the hashtag #SorryToKoreans and accepting the apology.

=== Taiwan ===
Anti-Korean sentiment (反韓) started to develop in Taiwan during the 1980s and erupted when South Korea started a formal diplomatic relationship with China in 1992. It later became stronger because of competitive relationships in local industry and sports. News coverage by local media also contributed to the sentiment. The sentiment reached its summit during the Sockgate in 2010, and declined as the Korean Wave became stronger in the 2010s.

=== Thailand ===
The popularity of the Korean wave in Thailand has led some Thai authorities to cast it as a threat to local culture. Some locals in 2017 reportedly began to perceive Hallyu negatively or as a form of cultural imperialism.

=== Vietnam ===
It has been reported that South Korean soldiers committed war crimes during the Vietnam War that killed somewhere between 40,000 and 50,000 civilians, which has led to lingering anti-Korean sentiment especially amongst older Vietnamese people. The South Korean government has long denied these charges. However, in 2020, reported Vietnamese survivors of these war crimes, including citizen Nguyen Thi Thanh, filed lawsuits against South Korea. By contrast, Vietnam and North Korea enjoyed a more positive relationship in the Vietnam War.

Allegations of sex trafficking in South Korea of Vietnamese women has also sparked some negative sentiment amongst Vietnamese people.

While the Korean Wave has been mostly enthusiastically accepted among younger women in Vietnam, there has been some pushback from government and the public. Criticisms focused on the perceived femininity of Korean male idols and perceived self-indulgence that went against the spirit of the collectivist Communist culture.

== Derogatory terms ==
=== In Chinese ===
- Gaoli bangzi or Han bangzi (Chinese: 韩棒子) – derogatory term used against ethnic Koreans that likens them to hillbillies. Gaoli refers to the historical Korean state Goryeo and Han refers to the native name for Korean people, while bangzi means "club".
- Gaoli paocai (simplified Chinese: 高丽泡菜; traditional Chinese: 高麗泡菜; pinyin: gāolì pàocài) – literally "Goryeo kimchi". Used by Taiwanese baseball fans, as a result of their rivalry against South Korea. Variants include 死泡菜 ("dead kimchi").

=== In Korean ===
- Hell Joseon (헬조선) – used internally in South Korea by South Koreans to criticize the country's difficult socioeconomic situation. The term is seen as being self-deprecating.
- Josen-jing (조센징) – used internally in South Korea by South Koreans as a reference to the Japanese slur for Koreans, Chōsenjin. (Note: In Korean, the corresponding term would be Joseon-in (조선인) or Joseon-saram (조선사람). Josen-jing intentionally mimics the Japanese pronunciation of the former.) It is seen as self-deprecating or even dehumanizing.
- Kimchi-nam and Kimchi-nyeo (김치남; 김치녀) – meaning literally "Kimchi male" and "Kimchi female". Used by younger South Koreans to pejoratively refer to perceived stereotypical Korean men or women. They have also become associated the conflict over feminism in South Korea.

=== In Filipino (Tagalog) ===
- Retoke Koreano – literally "plastic Korean", referring to South Korea's high rates of plastic surgery.

== See also ==
- Anti–North Korean sentiment
