= Anti-Sovietism =

Opposition to the Soviet Union

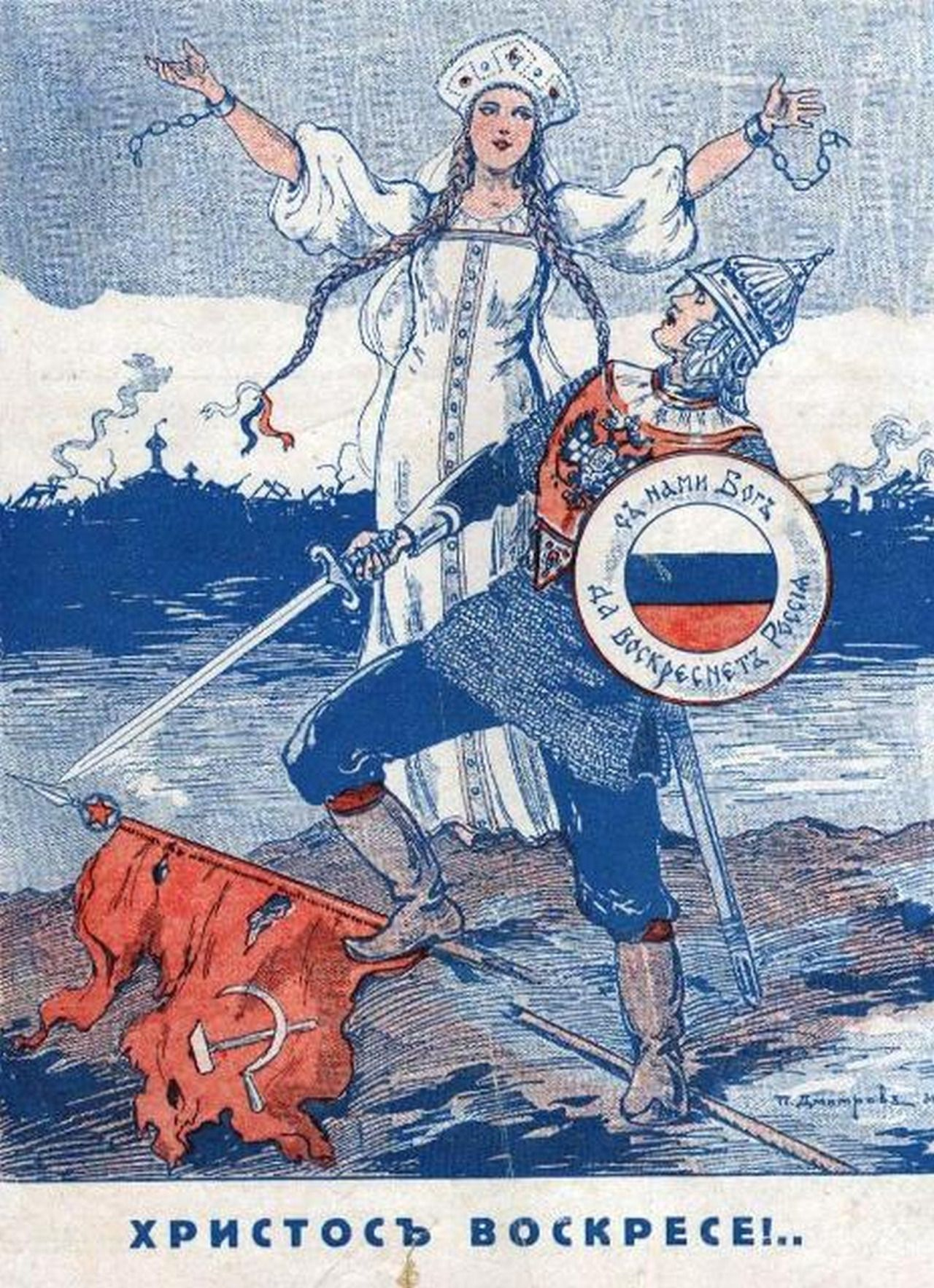
Russian émigré anti-Bolshevik poster, c. 1932

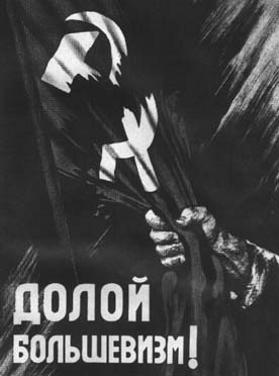
"Down with Bolshevism!" - Nazi propaganda poster in Russian for occupied Soviet territories

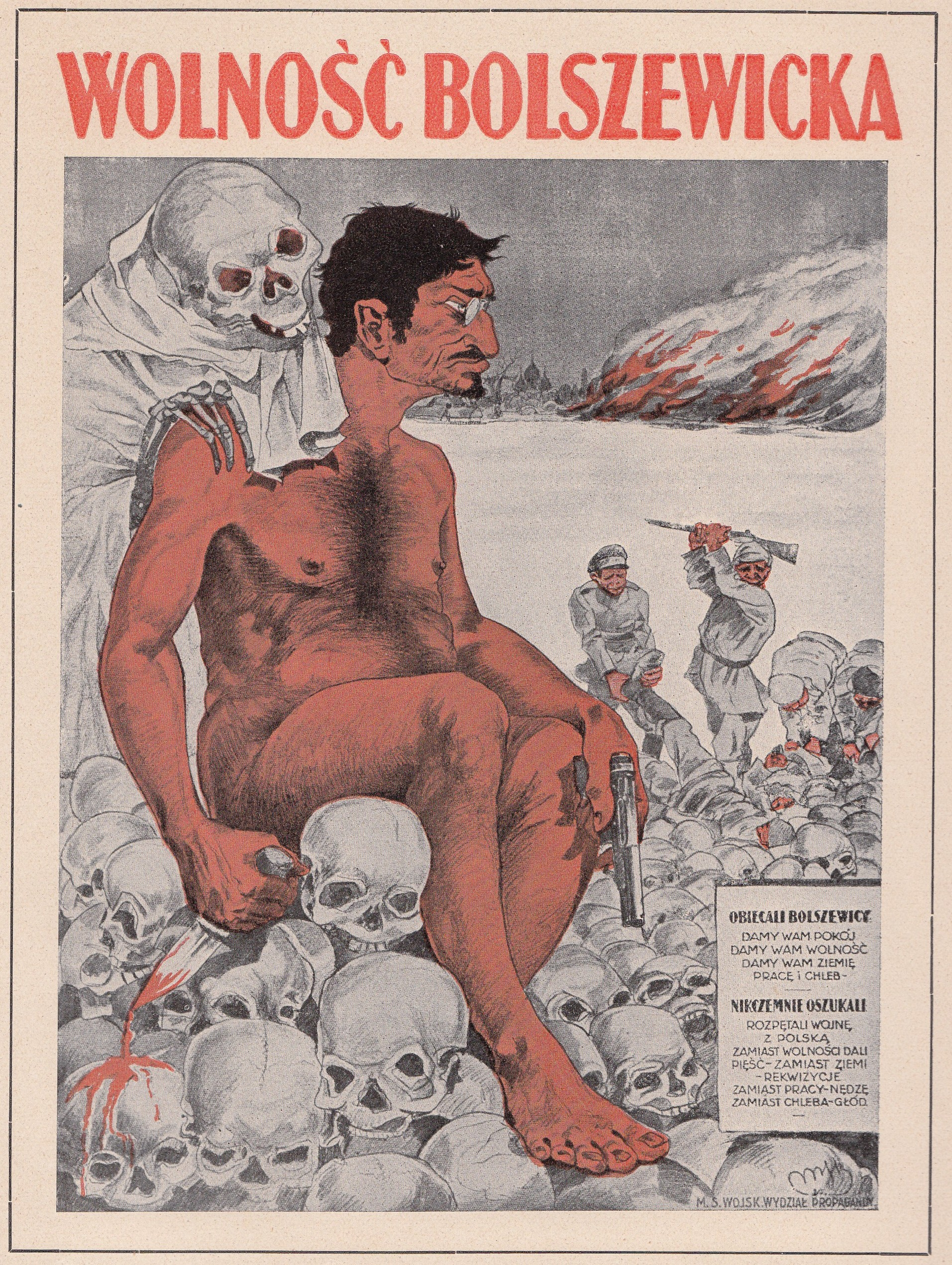
Polish anti-Soviet propaganda poster during the Polish–Soviet War, depicting Leon Trotsky (Note: The small caption in the lower right corner of this poster reads: The Bolsheviks promised: We'll give you peace We'll give you freedom We'll give you land Work and bread Despicably they cheated They started a war With Poland Instead of freedom they brought The fist Instead of land – confiscation Instead of work – misery Instead of bread – famine.)

Anti-Sovietism or anti-Soviet sentiment are activities that were actually or allegedly aimed against the Soviet Union or government power within the Soviet Union.

Three common uses of the term include the following:

- Anti-Soviet opponents of the Bolsheviks shortly after the Russian Revolution and during the Russian Civil War.
- Anti-Sovietism in international politics, such as the Western opposition to the Soviet Union during the Cold War as part of broader anti-communism.
- Soviet citizens (allegedly or actually) involved in anti-government activities.

== History ==
=== In the Soviet Union ===
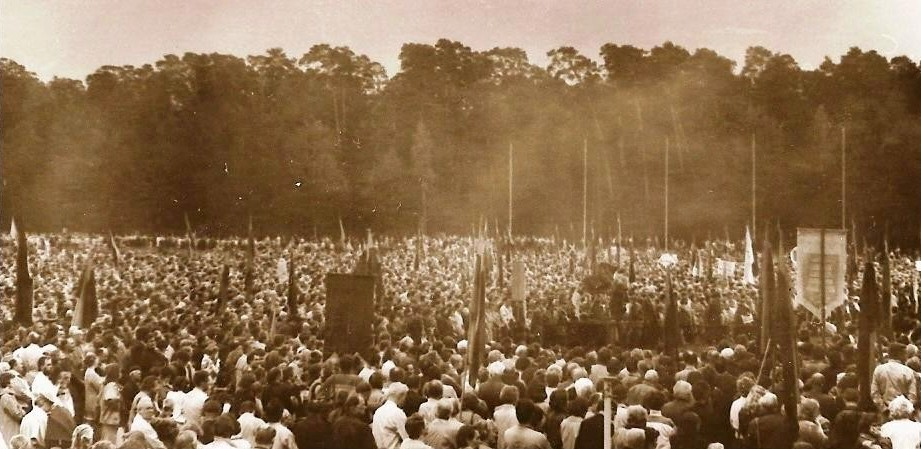
Anti-Soviet rally in Lithuania of about 300,000 people in 1988, condemning the Molotov–Ribbentrop Pact. Sąjūdis was a movement which led to the restoration of an Independent State of Lithuania in 1990.

During the Russian Civil War that followed the October Revolution of 1917, the anti-Soviet side was the White movement. During the Interwar period, some resistance movements, particularly in the 1920s, were cultivated by Polish intelligence in the form of the Promethean project. After Germany's attack on the Soviet Union in 1941, anti-Soviet forces were created and led primarily by Nazi Germany (see Russian Liberation Movement). During the Cold War, the United States led the anti-Soviet and anti-communist Western Bloc.

During the Russian Civil War, whole classes of people, such as the clergy, kulaks and former Imperial Russian officers, were automatically considered anti-Soviet. More categories are listed in the article "Enemy of the People". Those who were deemed anti-Soviet in this way, because of their former social status, were often presumed guilty whenever tried for a crime.

The Soviet Union made extensive use of the term "enemy of the people" (Russian: враг народа, romanized: vrag naroda). The term was first used in a speech by Felix Dzerzhinsky, the first chairman of the Cheka, after the October Revolution. The Petrograd Military Revolutionary Committee printed lists of "enemies of the people", and Vladimir Lenin invoked it in his decree of 28 November 1917:

all leaders of the Constitutional Democratic Party, as a party of enemies of the people, are hereby to be considered outlaws, and are to be arrested immediately and brought before the revolutionary court.

Other similar terms were in use as well:

- enemy of the labourers (Russian: враг трудящихся, romanized: vrag trudjaščihsja)
- enemy of the proletariat (Russian: враг пролетариата, romanized: vrag proletariata)
- class enemy (Russian: классовый враг, romanized: klassovyj vrag), etc.

In particular, the term "enemy of the workers" was formalized in the Article 58 (RSFSR Penal Code), and similar articles in the codes of the other Soviet Republics.

At various times these terms were applied, in particular, to Tsar Nicholas II and the Imperial family, aristocrats, the bourgeoisie, clerics, business entrepreneurs, anarchists, kulaks, monarchists, Mensheviks, Esers, Bundists, Trotskyists, Bukharinists, the "old Bolsheviks", the army and police, emigrants, saboteurs, wreckers (вредители, "vrediteli"), "social parasites" (тунеядцы, "tuneyadtsy"), Kavezhedists (people who administered and serviced the KVZhD (China Far East Railway), particularly the Russian population of Harbin, China), and those considered bourgeois nationalists (notably Russian, Ukrainian, Belarusian, Armenian, Lithuanian, Latvian, Estonian nationalists, Zionists, Basmachi).

Since 1927, Article 20 of the Common Part of the penal code that listed possible "measures of social defence" had the following item 20a: "declaration to be an enemy of the workers with deprivation of the union republic citizenship and hence of the USSR citizenship, with obligatory expulsion from its territory". Nevertheless, most "enemies of the people" suffered labor camps, rather than expulsion.

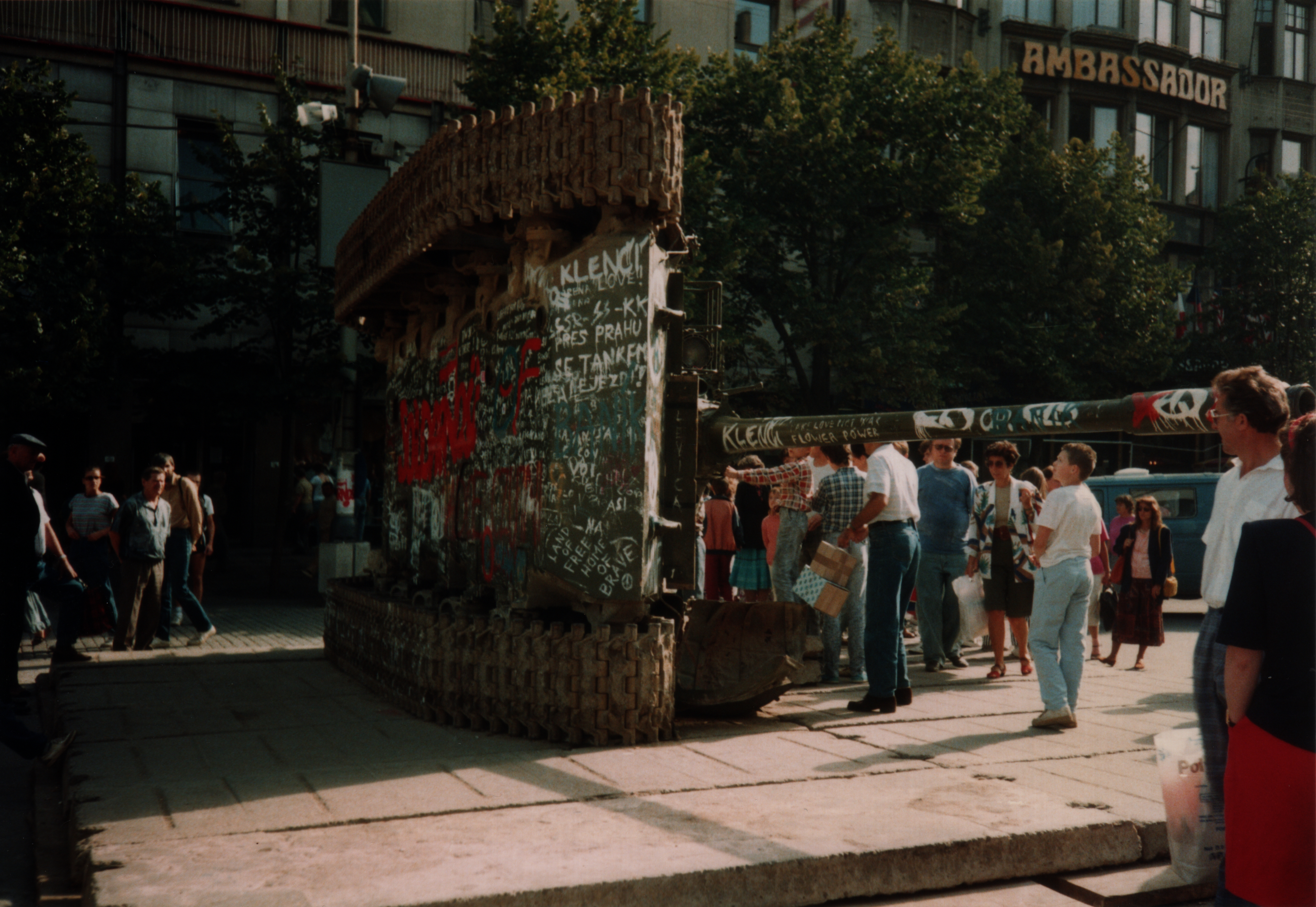
After the Velvet Revolution, the city of Prague placed a Soviet-era T-55, a symbol of the Soviet invasion of 1968, on its central square as a target for public ridicule.

Later in the Soviet Union, being anti-Soviet was a criminal offense, known as "Anti-Soviet agitation". The epithet "antisoviet" was synonymous with "counter-revolutionary". The noun "antisovietism" was rarely used and the noun "antisovietist" (Russian: антисоветчик, romanized: antisovetchik) was used in a derogatory sense. Anti-Soviet agitation and activities were political crimes handled by the Article 58 and later Article 70 of the RSFSR penal code and similar articles in other Soviet republics. In February 1930, there was an anti-Soviet insurgency in the Kazak Autonomous Socialist Soviet Republic village of Sozak.

After the end of the Second World War, there were Eastern European anti-Communist insurgencies against the Soviet Union.

=== In Post-Soviet countries ===
==== Estonia ====
In August 2022 Estonia began removing Soviet monuments, beginning with a T-34 tank in Narva, claiming it was necessary for "public order" and "internal security".

==== Latvia ====
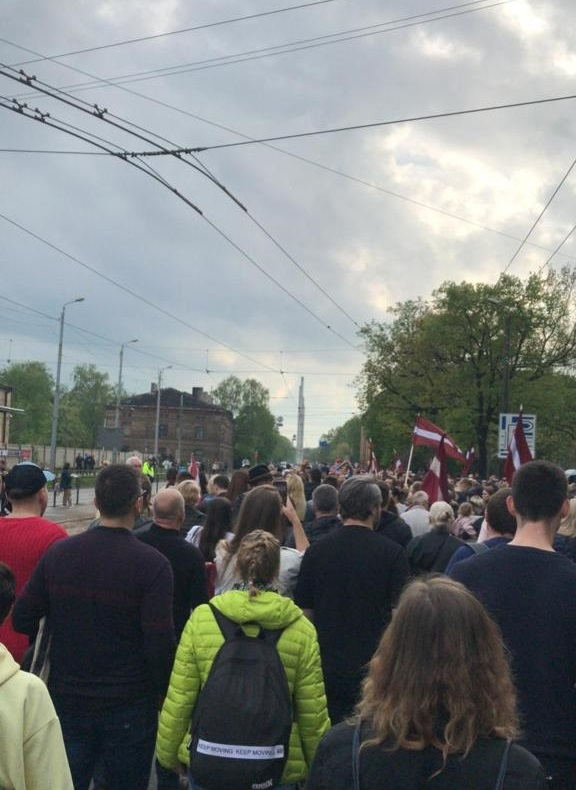
Demonstration in Riga to remove a Victory monument to the Red Army, May 2022

On 6 May 2022, following the Russian invasion of Ukraine, Latvian Prime Minister Krišjānis Kariņš announced that the removal of the Red Army monument commemorating the liberation of Latvia from German forces was inevitable. Five days later a public fundraising campaign was launched and more than 39,000 euros had been donated by 12 May when the Saeima voted to suspend the functioning of a section regarding the preservation of memorial structures in an agreement between Latvia and Russia. By 13 May, the total amount of donations had almost reached 200,000 euros.

A rally titled "Getting Rid of Soviet Heritage", which took place on March 20, 2022, was attended by approximately 5,000 people, while a counter rally by Latvian Russian Union was prevented from taking place by security forces, claiming threat to "public security".

A list of 93 street names still glorifying the Soviet era (such as 13 streets named after the Pioneer movement), as well as 48 street names given during the Russification at the end of the 19th century (like streets named after Alexander Pushkin), has been compiled by historians of the Public Memory Center and sent to the corresponding municipalities, recommending that they be changed.

== See also ==
- Anti-communism
  - Anti-Soviet partisans
  - Criticism of communist party rule
  - Eastern European anti-Communist insurgencies
  - White movement
  - Anti–North Korean sentiment, distinguished from anti-Korean sentiment
  - Anti–People's Republic of China sentiment, distinguished from anti-Chinese sentiment
- Anti-Russian sentiment
- Anti-Stalinist left
- Decommunization
  - Decommunization in Russia
  - Decommunization in Ukraine
  - List of monuments and memorials removed following the Russian invasion of Ukraine
- Enemy of the people
- German atrocities committed against Soviet prisoners of war
- Persecution of Christians in the Soviet Union
  - Catacomb Church
- Predictions of the collapse of the Soviet Union
- Political repression in the Soviet Union
  - Refusenik
  - Soviet dissidents
- Red Scare and Red Terror
- Russian war crimes in the 2022 Russian invasion of Ukraine
- Soviet Empire
- Timeline of events in the Cold War
- White émigré
