= Min Guo =

Min Guo may refer to:

- Republic of China (disambiguation)
- Min Kingdom
