= Year Hare Affair =

Chinese webcomic and animated series

那年那兔那些事
- Genre: Historical, comedy
- Author: Lin Chao
- Publisher: Sina Weibo
- Original run: 13 June 2011 – present

Year Hare Affair (Chinese: 那年那兔那些事(儿); lit. 'Those stories of that rabbit that happened in those years') is a Chinese webcomic and media franchise by Lin Chao (林超), initially under the pen name "逆光飞行" (Pinyin: Nìguāng Fēixíng, lit. "flight against the light"). The comic uses anthropomorphic animals as an allegory for nations and sovereign states to represent 20th- and 21st-century political, military, and diplomatic events.

== Animation ==
Year Hare Affair was inspired by a lengthy post on a military web forum.

Lin Chao created the animation. It launched in 2015 and had its seventh season in 2025.

== Overview ==
The series uses anthropomorphic figures to depict China's history during and after the Cold War period. China is represented by a white rabbit, which the series portrays as peaceful and intelligent. In the words of the series creator, the hare is "harmless to humans and animals alike."

Yare Hare Affair conveys patriotic themes through metaphor and ideologically-vested euphemism. The series calls on every hare to help "building China as a powerful nation".

== Characters ==
=== Factions and characters ===
Nations / Sovereign states	Appearance	Reasons and source of the appearance
People's Republic of China (or Chinese Communist Party)	Hare	Hares are herbivorous animals that are usually considered cute, docile and populous, as well as being "harmless to humans and animals alike" (Chinese: 人畜无害), but can still inflict nasty bites and kicks when irritated, representing the People's Republic of China's traditionally not so aggressive foreign policies, but can still pack a heavy punch when required. Another explanation for it is that the Chinese words for "comrade" and "rabbit/hare" sound very similar when pronounced with a Shanghainese accent, as famously coined by crosstalk comedian Jiang Kun during the 1980s. The Hare normally prefers to act friendly and moe in front of others and is obsessed with working the fields harvesting carrots and earning "small money", but when provoked into fighting often wields a cleaver and a brick in each hand while emitting a hellish black aura, and later learns to "plant mushrooms" and build "water cabinets". When extremely enraged, the Hare dons a green dinosaur suit, grabs a kitchen cleaver and a brick and becomes a Godzilla-like monster that breathes fire.
Republic of China	Baldhead	Based on the (absence of) hair of Chiang Kai-shek. In Standard Chinese the words "baldhead" (秃子 tūzi) and "Hare" (兔子 tùzi) are near-homophones.
Hong Kong Democrats	Cockroach	Based on the slur used by Hong Kong police against Anti-ELAB Protestors. Some big wig cockroaches such as HSBC executives have a yellow sticker on a front leg.
Qing dynasty and Manchukuo	Pigtail	Based on the queues which is the Manchu hairstyle of the Qing dynasty. (辫子 biànzi).
United States	Bald eagle	Bald eagle is the national bird of the United States of America.
Canada	Beaver	Beavers are officially considered Canada’s national animal and often represent the country as a whole. Could also be a reference to a popular joke surrounding Canadian pop star Justin Bieber, in which his last name would be replaced with “Beaver”.
Mexico	Axolotl	Axolotl are famous in Mexico, as they are featured on the Mexican peso and were revered in Aztec culture as a deity. They also wear a sombrero, a stereotypical Mexican headdress.
Various South American countries (i.e. Brazil and Argentina)	Armadillo	The nine-banded armadillo is a cultural icon in various Latin American cultures, and can be found throughout the region, though other species such as the Brazilian three-banded armadillo live in the region as well.
Soviet Union	Brown bear	Bear is a common national personification for Russia and the USSR starting from the Russian Empire. The Soviet bear has a symbol — the hammer and sickle of Communism — on his stomach, which later becomes more like a character, "父", meaning "father" in Chinese.
Russia	Brown bear	To differentiate from Soviet Union, this bear has a character "大" ("big" in Chinese, or "eldest" when describing age order of siblings) on his stomach, meaning that he is the "eldest son" of the USSR. The hair refers to "毛子" ("hairy ones", referring to the comparatively higher body hair count in Caucasians), a common northern Chinese nickname for Russians (and all East Slavs by extension).
Ukraine	Brown bear	To differentiate from Russia, this bear has a number "2" on his stomach, meaning that he is the "second son" of the USSR.
Belarus	Brown bear	To differentiate from Russia, this bear has a number "3" on his stomach, meaning that he is the "third son" of the USSR.
Japan	Poussin (insists on being addressed as Crane)	The crane is an important symbol of Japanese culture, despite the green pheasant (who are Galliformes while cranes are Gruiformes) being Japan’s official national bird. However, it is mocked and called poussin in canon.
South Korea	Stick with a M1 helmet	Bangzi is an ethnic slur by Chinese people towards Koreans. To differentiate with North Korea, a US-style combat helmet is added to the appearance of South Korea.
North Korea	Stick with a military skicap	To differentiate with South Korea, a Communist-style red star cap is added to the appearance of North Korea.
Various Southeast Asian countries: Vietnam, Indonesia, Philippines	Snub-nosed monkey	Discrimination against Southeast Asians
Thailand	Kalij pheasant	Thailand is home to several pheasant species, including the Kalij pheasant.
Pakistan	Markhor	Markhor is commonly seen in Pakistan and the national animal. In the animation the Markhor is called Ba Ba Yang ("Pak Goat") and sometimes nicknamed "Little Ba" by the Hare.
India	White elephant	White elephant is commonly seen in India as an important part of Hindu mythology. In the animation the author chooses it rather than the bull which is sacred in Hindu to represent India because bull has already been used to represent the UK.
United Kingdom	Bull	"John Bull" is a national personification of England and the United Kingdom in general.
Spain	Bull	Bullfighting is a popular sport in Spain. He is red in coloration most likely due to the misconception that bulls are angry when viewing the color red.
France	Gallic rooster	Gallic rooster is an unofficial national symbol of France.
Portugal	Black rooster	The Rooster of Barcelos is a popular symbol of Portugal and its culture.
Cuba	Crocodile	Based on the shape of the country. Could also be a reference to the Cuban crocodile.
Germany, Belgium, Luxembourg, Austria-Hungary, Switzerland	Cat	The Tiger I/II heavy tanks and the Jagdtiger series tank destroyers are the most famous German armoured fighting vehicles from the Second World War, so in the comic Germany was at first a tiger called "Hans". But since both East and West Germany had been restricted in military strength after World War II, the "big cat" have been "tamed" and "downsized" to "small cats".
Italy	She-wolf	The Italian wolf is the national animal of Italy (albeit unofficially.) A she-wolf is also a famed mythological creature known for raising the founders of Rome; Romulus and Remus.
Various Balkan countries (Serbia, Kosovo, Bosnia and Herzegovina, etc.)	Goose	Geese are stereotypically known to be aggressive, similar to many people’s perceptions of the Balkan countries’ relations with each other (especially Serbia-Kosovo’s)
Greece	Dove	The Greek goddess Aphrodite is often symbolized with a dove. She wears a laurel of olive branches to represent the dove’s association with peace.
Finland	Lynx	Lynxes are the only occurring wild felines in Finland, where their populations are growing at a gradual pace.
Various African countries in: Libyan Arab Jamahiriya, Tanzania, Sudan, South Sudan, Eritrea	Hippopotamus	Hippopotamus is a large, mostly herbivorous mammal in Sub-Saharan Africa generally stereotyped as being simple-witted and clumsy. Both in the comic and the animation, nearly all African countries mentioned are represented by hippopotamus, except for the Ugandan junta regime under Idi Amin. Also, "Colonel Ka the Hippo" sometimes symbolizes Muammar Gaddafi himself other than the country. Sudan and South Sudan only appear in the end of Episode 3, Season 2 of the animation.
Uganda	Duck	"Uncle Crazy Duck" is the nickname of Idi Amin Dada among Chinese netizens. He wears a hippopotamus fursuit with loose screws on the head, meaning that his brain is "different" from other Africans. In the animation, Uncle Crazy Duck shouts "Banana!" during speeches like the Minions.
Various Arab world countries: Afghanistan, Saudi Arabia, Iraq, Pahlavi Iran	Camel	Camel is commonly seen and used as transportation in the arid, desert Middle East and Central Asia. Both in the comic and the animation, nearly all mentioned Arabic countries are represented by camels, but they have different appearance — Afghan camel wears a scarf and is bearded; Saudi (and other Gulf nations by extension) camel wears a scarf and many diamonds; Iraqi camel under the Saddam Hussein regime wears a military beret; and Iranian camel during the Pahlavi dynasty has a crown on his head.
Post-revolution Iran	Lion	Lion is the symbol of ancient Iran and the Persian Empire. The religious reform of Ruhollah Khomeini made the shia-majority Iran quite different from its sunni Arabic neighbours, and so the author chooses the symbol of ancient Persia to represent it.
Israel	Hoopoe	The hoopoe is the national bird of Israel.
Australia	Kangaroo	The kangaroo is a prominent symbol of Australia, being recognizable to people outside of the country and is featured as one of the supporters on the Australian coat of arms.

=== Others ===
Character	Avatar	Reasons and source of the appearance
Lin Chao (author)	Dragon	"Twiny snake" (Chinese: 麻蛇) is one of the author's online nicknames, and comes in the form of a small green dragon with a pair of yellow antlers. The author is often violently beaten up by other characters for inappropriately awkward straight man talks, and frequently threatened by the Hare to be cooked into a pasty soup — a running in-joke about the author's notoriety of often delaying the periodic updates of the comic series. The Chinese characters for "update" (更) and "paste" (羹) are homophones both pronouncing Gēng, causing the series' fans to create a parodic light poetry: "if the Snake doesn't update, make [him into] a snake paste (Chinese: 麻蛇不更麻蛇羹)."
Lin Chao's wife	Snail Fairy	Lin Chao's girlfriend (whom he married later) was often used as an excuse when he failed to update the comics on time, so an avatar is created as a recurrent cameo character who is a homemaker for the author, like in the Chinese legend of the Snail Fairy.
Director of the animated cartoon	Tree	"Two Tree" (Chinese: 二树) is the online username of the director/producer of the comics' animated series, so an avatar is created as a cameo character.
Suning.com	Lion	Suning.com is a sponsor of the animated series, and its mascot is a lion.

== Included events (in order by year) ==
- Chinese Communist Revolution
- Second Sino-Japanese War
- Hundred Regiments Offensive
- Cold War
- Indo-Pakistani wars and conflicts
- Korean War
- Vietnam War
- 30 September Movement
- Sino-Soviet Split
- Sino-Soviet border conflict
- Cultural Revolution
- Reform and opening up
- Senkaku Islands dispute
- United Nations General Assembly Resolution 2758
- 1972 Nixon visit to China
- The Signing of Joint Communiqué of the Government of Japan and the Government of the People's Republic of China
- Battle of the Paracel Islands
- Uganda–Tanzania War
- Sino-Vietnamese War
- Soviet–Afghan War
- Iran–Iraq War
- Gulf War
- Dissolution of the Soviet Union
- U.S. bombing of the Chinese embassy in Belgrade
- Yinhe incident
- Third Taiwan Strait Crisis
- Kosovo War
- Hainan Island incident
- War in Afghanistan (2001–2021)
- September 11 attacks
- Chen Shui-bian corruption charges
- The Commission of Chinese aircraft carrier Liaoning
- Scarborough Shoal standoff

== Video game ==
A free-to-play strategy role-playing video game based on the webcomic, was released on iOS and Android on 15 July 2015. The player controls one of three factions: Hare, Bald Eagle and Bear. Another game called “Year Hare Affair: Burning Snow” was also released sometime later, and can currently be played on itch.io. An educational game about Chinese history was also released and unlike the first two, this one can be played in its original format.

== Reception ==
Hare (Chinese: 我兔; lit. 'Our rabbit') is now used as Internet slang referring to China.

=== Criticisms ===
The historical vision, provided in the first two seasons of Year Hare Affair, came under heavy criticism in an overview on the Russian website South China Insight, especially Sino-Soviet relations. Though it is admitted that relations with Russia "occupy a leading place" in reflecting of Chinese history, but with a "complete disregard for historical facts", such as Soviet involvement in the Chinese Communist Party's foundation and the Red Army's liberation of Manchuria from Japanese forces. It was also noted that the Sino-Vietnamese War has been completely left out.

Oiwan Lam of Global Voices Online finds racism in portraying African nations as hippopotamuses, which she considers "a lazy and stupid animal". In that regard, "China's aid for Africa has also been simplified as a last resort because 'the first world refused to play with us'".

Some commentators argue that the webcomic and its animated adaptation oversimplify complex historical events, potentially promoting nationalist sentiment or stereotypes, especially in its depiction of countries such as Japan, South Korea, and the United States. Critics have also pointed out instances where the series' satirical elements may reinforce negative stereotypes or historical grievances rather than fostering understanding. Conversely, defenders of the series highlight its satirical and entertainment-focused intent, suggesting that it should not be interpreted as a historical documentary or a precise representation of historical facts, but rather as a creative work aimed at humor and satire.

=== Ratings ===
The second and third season received 8.6 and 8.4 points out of 10 on Douban.
