= Republican China =

Republican China may refer to:

- The Republic of China on the mainland with distinctive periods:
  - Beiyang government (1912–1928)
  - Nationalist government (1925–1948)
  - Wang Jingwei regime, a puppet state of the Empire of Japan (1940–1945)
- The Republic of China on Taiwan (since the aftermath of World War II, 1949–present)
  - The Taiwan Area, also called the "free area of the Republic of China", the area under its effective control

== See also ==
- Republic of China (disambiguation)
