= Propaganda in South Korea =

Propaganda in South Korea counters the extensive propaganda of rival North Korea or influence domestic and foreign audiences. According to the French philosopher and author Jacques Ellul, propaganda exists as much in a democracy as in authoritarian regimes. South Korea's democracy uses propaganda to further its national interests and objectives. Methods of propaganda dissemination involve means of modern media to include television, radio, cinema, print, and the internet.

== Themes ==
=== Anti-communism ===
A national identity of anti-communism formed in South Korea under president Syngman Rhee after the nation’s inception in 1948. Strong anti-communist propaganda themes were created to counter North Korean communism and subversion which was seen as the threat. The South Korean government enacted legislation against “anti-national” activities in 1948 and firmly establishing an anti-communist ideology with the National Security Act. The act outlawed any dissent or criticism of the ruling South Korean government, effectively making communism illegal. This included the media, art, literature and music. South Korea sought to establish itself as distinctly democratic and opposed to North Korea's communist national identity. This external theme was to lobby for the support of the United States for South Korea’s security. South Korean propaganda needed to counter the heavy pro-communist propaganda of North Korea and the cult of personality surrounding Kim Il-Sung. The competing propaganda themes sought to draw defectors to their respective ideologies in hopes of reuniting the peninsula. The anti-communist mindset was more firmly entrenched after the Korean War furthering animosity and the split between the two Koreas.

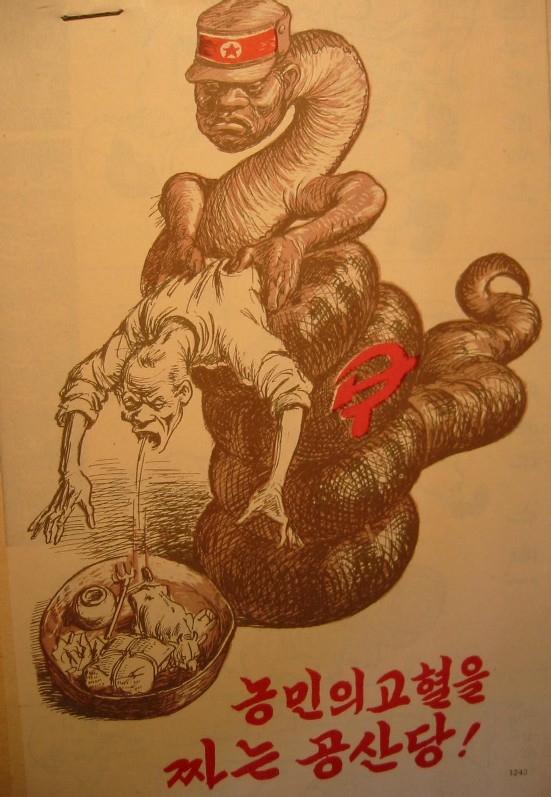
Figure 1 - A South Korean propaganda leaflet produced during the Korean War, with its caption stating (translated): "The communist party, squeezing out the sweat and blood of the farmers!"

=== Korean War ===
Propaganda was an important tool of war for South Korea in defending against the North Korean invasion and its propaganda attacks. The anti-communist ideology was firmly set and used to reinforce the South Korean national identity. The south needed to mobilize its own populace to survive and fight in a total war. According to the political scientist and author, Harold D. Lasswell in his study of World War I propaganda, nations at war demonize their enemy to reinforce the support of the populace and allies. Demonizing propaganda sought to “fortify the mind of the nation with examples of the insolence and depravity of the enemy.” Propaganda directed at North Korea was as vitriolic as the themes directed at South Korea. South Korean propaganda exploited the fact that the north launched the unprovoked invasion and often stalled negotiations for a ceasefire.

In firstly considering the predominating form of this propaganda media, it’s worth noting that it often came in the form of leaflets called ppira (삐라) disseminated by government bodies and supportive organizations.

These were essentially bill/paper-based instruments containing graphical and textual information supporting a certain narrative or message. The purpose behind employing this form was primarily based on facilitating wide-scale distribution and spread, the documents being easy to produce and replicate, being broadly inexpensive, as well as being capable of conveying a variety of information via textual and graphical means. Furthermore, from a functional standpoint, it’s worth noting that this ppira based form of propaganda effectively represented an additional frontier of battle/warfare in the Korean War: that of psychological persuasion and attacking. At a broad level, this involved promoting certain ideals or qualities among populaces both domestically and abroad, as well as discouraging and discrediting those of opposing forces. In the context of the Korean War, this directly related to notions and narratives of capitalism versus communism, innocence versus brutality, and conflict-resolution versus bellicosity. Further segmenting this analysis, common categorizations of Korean War period leaflets typically involved three primary types: strategic leaflets, tactical leaflets, and consolidation leaflets. Strategic leaflets aimed at breaking the opposition’s will to fight via catalyzing resentment, suspicion, and demoralization among enemy forces (e.g., soldiers and their skeptical relationships to leading/commanding forces); tactical leaflets aimed assisting military operations via some psychological impact (e.g., urging surrender, informing/intimidating enemy troops of incoming attacks, etc.); and consolidation leaflets aimed at restoring/sustaining civic order across different arenas of life when following military success or occupation.

Narrowing in from this broader analysis of form and function, it is worth considering the different perspectives which employed these different forms of propaganda over the course of the war. In considering South Korea’s perspective on the war, this can be analyzed in one form via one prominently produced and disseminated ppira work.

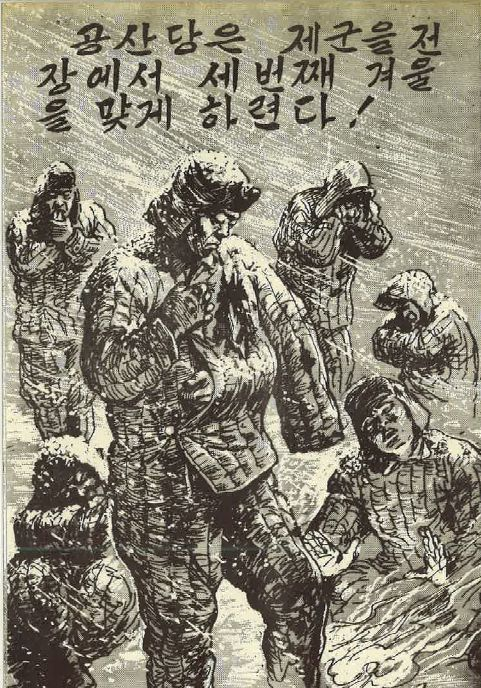
Figure 2 - South Korean depiction of soldiers at war.

Figure 2 represents a strategic leaflet produced and disseminated by the United States in conjunction with the South Korean government during the latter years of the war. The text on the piece translates as “Communists force you into a third winter of war!”, with a few key connotations.

First, there is division drawn between the communist forces of North Korea, the Soviet Union, and China, as well as the capitalist forces of South Korea and its allied forces of the United States, United Nations, and others. This serves to denigrate and show a negative light on the communist ideologically relative to the capitalists per this propaganda. Furthermore, the aspect of being forced into continued warring by the opposing forces suggests that South Korea and its allies are seeking peace and conflict-resolution as opposed to war, unlike their most bellicose counterparts in terms of North Korea and their allies, who sought to conquer South Korea and impose this communist ideology on the entirety of the Korean peninsula. The intended conveyance of this piece not only serves to highlight why South Koreans domestically continued to suffer at the hands of their ideologically-opposed communist counterparts, but more importantly why North Koreans - broadly more aligned with communist ideology - continued to suffer, with the hopes of converting them to sympathizers of the South Koreans/pro-capitalist ideology and broadly weakening the North Korean/communist ideology. In effect, it sought to espouse feelings of doubt and frustration among North Korean citizens against their communist government regime.

In terms of the formal elements of the piece that support the conveyance of this overarching message, the use of line reinforces the harsh and rugged motif of the piece via the rough strokes of the snow, for example. Likewise, the color and tone of the piece are relatively dull, dreary, and muted, highlighting the rough and brutal circumstances that the individuals had to endure as a result of the war. In terms of spacing and composition, the figures are relatively congested and cramped, in turn furthering these suboptimal war conditions. Lastly, the texture of the piece conveyed through factors such as the grainy background as well as the rough clothing of the soldiers further emphasizes the coarse nature of these warring conditions experienced by the soldiers.

The international perspective relevant to propaganda in South Korea during the Korean War can be largely encompassed by the pro-capitalist/Western figures in the international community. This in turn can be encompassed by that of an anglo-centric poster produced by the pro-capitalist, U.S.-supported the United Nations (Figure 3). In terms of specific objectives, among the most prominent in this particular piece involves legitimizing the role of the United Nations. As a novel entity forming around the conclusion of WWII in 1945, the Korean War represented a test of the strength of the United Nations and its peace-keeping ability, particularly the United Nations Security Council, in the midst of rising Cold War tensions between the Soviet Union and the United States; the former gaining influence over the North and the latter over the South of the Korean peninsula following WWII.

The U.S.-backed United Nations directly highlighted the necessity of their proxy/involvement in the Korean War under the narrative of protecting South Korea against the North Korean invasion. This is clearly visualized through the United Nations and member countries surrounding the “Communist Aggressors” or “War Makers” in providing protection for the “Republic of Korea” as per figures in the photo.

In addition, the depiction of “Communist Aggressors” in the form of a violent instigator is clear through the depiction of the antagonizing figure, and a clear allusion to these pro-capitalist forces denigrating communism ideologically and righteously is also present in this regard (e.g., referring to the “Communist Aggressor” as a “Criminal”, etc.). From a formal element perspective, the space and composition of the piece is condensed and unified towards the center, directly highlighting the collaborative/joint-international effort of the pro-capitalists against the invasive communist regime. In terms of line, the use is well-defined and detailed in its depictions of the varieties of figures and components of the piece (e.g., assisting hand of the United Nations, country flags representing pro-capitalist assisting nations, etc.). Lastly, in terms of shape, these are well-defined and large/imposing, highlighting the important elements of the piece in terms of the pro-capitalist and pro-communist forces, as well as the emphatic message conveyed by the text.

In essence, it’s clear that the Korean War represented a particularly prominent arena for propaganda pieces of various functionalities (e.g., strategic, tactical, consolidation), particularly predominating via leaflets known as ppira. This involved ideologies such as communism and capitalism as well as across a variety of perspectives both domestically and internationally, and was particularly relevant for propaganda in South Korea.

=== Economic prosperity ===
South Korea worked to rebuild after the devastation of the Korean War. Propaganda worked to reinforce the ideology of the people working together to rebuild. Propaganda themes of economic prosperity were also to show South Korea as superior to North Korea and counter its anti-capitalist themes. Several economic reforms were enacted under president Park Chung-Hee from the 1960s and 1970s that were credited with South Korea’s current economic success. South Korea now ranks 15th among world economies rising from third world status after the war. The New Village Movement or Saemaul Movement beginning in 1970 was considered an ideological movement directed by the Park government to the South Korean people to motivate them toward development. President Park praises his economic achievements as an example for other countries in his self-laudatory book, “To Build a Nation.” In the book, Park describes his economic plans and the statistical results borne from developmental reforms. The difference in economic development between North and South Korea was evident by the early 1970s. The challenges of the economic theme was revealing the growing quality of life in the south to the North Korean people and subvert the Kim Il-Sung regime. During the first bilateral talks between the two countries since the end of the war, the North Korean delegation was brought into the South Korean capital of Seoul. Seeing the rebuilt city and the bustling traffic in it, the leader of the North Korean delegation said, “We’re not stupid, you know. It’s obvious you’ve ordered all the cars in the country to be brought into Seoul to fool us.”. Lee Bum-suk, the chief representative of the South Korean delegation, replied, “Well, you’ve rumbled that one, but that was the easy part. The hard bit was moving in all the buildings.”. The propaganda rivalry using the theme of South Korean prosperity versus the failed ideology of the north manifests itself today. South Korea renewed projecting propaganda across the Demilitarized Zone in response to North Korean attacks in 2010. Loudspeakers and radio messages included popular music, or K-Pop, flaunting ideas of free will and prosperity.

=== Ethno-nationalist pride ===
A strong Korean national identity based on ethnic pride has always been a part of Korean culture. The Imperial Japanese used ethno-nationalist propaganda themes during the occupation of Korea from 1910 to 1945. It then served to maintain Korean subservience convincing them that the Japanese and Korean peoples are one, morally pure race. Techniques used by the Japanese were adopted by both north and south after liberation in 1945. South Korean reinforcing propaganda continued to use ethno-nationalist themes of “koreanness,” to hold the support of the people.

==== Reunification ====
South Korean ethno-nationalist propaganda would be used to reconcile with the north. Narratives appealing to common race and common ethnic identity is hoped to improve relations with the north and lead toward reunification. The South Korean Sunshine Policy from 1998 to 2008 used such propaganda themes to increase contact and cooperation between north and south.

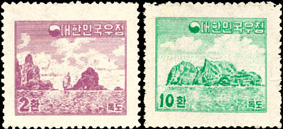
South Korean stamps with a picture of Dokdo from 1954.

==== Legacy of the Japanese occupation ====
South Korean propaganda is often projected toward Japan in a persistent island dispute off the peninsula's east coast. Known as Dokdo in Korea or Takeshima in Japan, the disputed island is the subject of a propaganda war between South Korea and Japan.

==== Relations with the United States ====
The United States remains a key ally to South Korea and keeps a military presence to deter a second Korean War. Younger generations of South Koreans without memory of the war or poverty in its aftermath look upon the US role and continued military presence unfavorably. Governmental relations remain strong while polls of South Koreans show more unfavorable views of the US while favorable views of North Korea improved. This changed significantly in 2010 after a series of attacks by North Korea including the sinking of the South Korean navy frigate, ROKS Cheonan.

== Methods ==
=== Film ===
Popular South Korean films often show reunification themes with friendships or family ties across the north and south division. The film Joint Security Area (2000) was the highest grossing Korean film up to that time. The movie depicted a friendship between soldiers from the north and south along the DMZ.

=== Radio ===
South Korea broadcasts radio messages toward North Korea with news and propaganda themes. The South Korean government reduced projecting propaganda through the Sunshine Policy years. Propaganda broadcasts resumed after the election of the hardline president Lee Myung-bak in 2008 and increased after violent attacks by North Korea in 2010.

=== Newspapers ===
South Korea has a free press like other democratic nations. South Korean newspapers are a forum for criticisms and support for political ideas and the government. Media coverage frequently is focused on North Korea and prospects for reunification. Sensitivity about the Dokdo island dispute is also a common propaganda theme covered in South Korean print media.

=== Leaflets ===
Leaflets with propaganda themes are sent by balloon to North Korea in hopes of reaching the populace with information. South Korean leaflet activity may start and stop depending on the level of dialog between the two Koreas. Anti-communist or anti-North Korea organizations, not necessarily the South Korean government, may deliver propaganda leaflets.

On 12 June 2026, former President of South Korea Yoon Suk Yeol was found guilty of treason and abuse of power for ordering drones to be flown into North Korea in October 2024 to drop propaganda leaflets over Pyongyang on three occasions, to provoke North Korea and help justify his martial law declaration; he was sentenced to 30 years imprisonment.

=== Internet ===
Both North Korea and South Korea engage in a propaganda war on the internet. Hackers from both sides will attack and shut down each other's websites and direct propaganda messages through social networks.

== See also ==
- Bias in reporting on North Korea
- Lee Seung-bok
