= Uljin–Samcheok Landings =

1968 unsuccessful infiltration attempt by North Korea

Uljin-Samcheok landings
- Part of the Korean DMZ Conflict and the Cold War
- South Korean forces search out for North Korean commandos following the landings
Date	October 30, 1968 – December 26, 1968
Location	Uljin and Samcheok, Gangwon Province
Result	South Korea–American victory

Belligerents
South Korea; United States	North Korea

Commanders and leaders
Park Chung Hee; Lyndon B. Johnson; Charles Bonesteel III	Kim Il Sung

Units involved
US 6th Combat Aviation Platoon; 26th Rear Area Security Division; Republic of Korea Reserve Forces; Republic of Korea Marine Corps U.S. 2nd Infantry Division	KPA Unit 124

Strength
Total Strength: 70,000	Total Strength: 120

Casualties and losses
Total casualties: South Korea; 63 killed (incl. 23 civilians); United States; 3 killed 3 wounded	Total casualties: North Korea; 110 killed 7 captured 3 unaccounted for

- Uljin–Samcheok Landings
- Hangul: 울진·삼척 무장 공비 침투 사건
- Hanja: 蔚珍三陟武裝共匪浸透事件
- RR: Uljin·Samcheok mujang gongbi chimtu sageon
- MR: Ulchin·Samch'ŏk mujang kongbi ch'imt'u sakŏn

The Uljin-Samcheok landings was an unsuccessful attempt by North Korea to establish guerrilla camps in the Taebaek Mountains from October 30, 1968, in order to topple Park Chung-hee's regime and bring about the reunification of Korea.

As the Korean Demilitarized Zone (DMZ) became increasingly harder to penetrate following the Blue House Raid, Kim Il Sung deployed 120 North Korean commandos along eight separate coastal locations between Uljin and Samcheok in Gangwon Province on a mission to indoctrinate South Korean citizens. However, the attempt failed, and the North Korean commandos were routed by South Korean and American forces.

== Background ==
=== Aftermath of the Korean War ===
The Korean Armistice Agreement of July 27, 1953, which was purely military in nature, ended the Korean War. However it and the 1954 Geneva Conference that followed failed to deliver a peaceful political settlement to the overall conflict, resulting in an impasse which continues at present. After the war, Syngman Rhee and Kim Il Sung pursued opposing strategies towards reunification.

The United Nations Command (UNC) headquarters maintained operations after the Korean War. The United States assumed executive control over the UNC. Given the absence of a formal peace treaty superseding the 1953 armistice, UNC retained operational control over the Republic of Korea Armed Forces (ROKA), which consisted of the South Korean army, air force and navy in the event of large scale hostilities. United States military forces which existed out of the direct purview of UNC, remained subordinate to the United States Pacific Command (with the exception of the Seventh Fleet and the Fifth Air Force at the time). In order to grant the UNC unified control over both ROKA and United States troops, the U.S. allowed Charles H. Bonesteel III to assume multiple posts as the commander of the UNC, U.S. Forces Korea and the Eighth U.S. Army.

=== Vietnam War ===
In March 1965, the U.S. deployed ground forces in the Vietnam War. Kim recognized an opportunity to achieve reunification in which the possibility of U.S. retaliation and assistance towards South Korea would be minimal. He believed that the U.S. would be preoccupied with fighting in Vietnam and become reluctant to bear the increased cost of engaging in another overseas military conflict. By instigating the removal of the U.S. from South Korea, the balance would be tipped in favor of North Korea.

North Korea also speculated about driving a wedge between South Korea and the United States. North Korea planned to exploit the United States' commitment towards a low intensity conflict in the area. North Korea aimed to antagonize the South Korean president Park Chung-hee's agenda to resolve what he perceived as a high stakes national security issue, thereby leading to the deterioration of South Korea-United States relations.

Finally, Kim sought to take advantage of South Korea's reduced military capacity. For the first time since 1953, South Korea had divided its military effort, dispatching the 9th Infantry Division to fight in Vietnam. From September 1965 to 15 October 1966, South Korea sent a combat force of over 46,000 soldiers and marines.

=== Widening economic and diplomatic gap between the two Koreas ===
Kim was dependent on Soviet industrial and technological aid and agricultural assistance from China. However, after failing to plot a middle course between Nikita Khrushchev's and Mao Zedong's ideological differences over competing strains of the Communist ideology, North Korea lost Soviet aid in December 1962. As a result, conventional warfare could no longer be sustained. Meanwhile, aid from U.S. and United Nations countries in the 1950s under Syngman Rhee paved the way for South Korea's rapid economic growth, with GNP growing 5.5% annually, while industry expanded at 4.4%. After Park seized control through the May 16 coup-d'état, he continued accelerating economic growth combined with increased military spending. In light of these developments, Kim felt threatened by South Korea's emerging power and moreover, ability to invade the North. As early as December 10, 1962, Kim drafted a new "military line" to the 5th Plenum of the Workers' Party of Korea (WPK) Central Committee, which outlined major changes in military strategy. Kim advocated for the modernization of his forces under the ideology of an army of cadres, to which force on force warfare was substituted for unconventional warfare.

Furthermore, international diplomatic developments in 1965–67 prompted Kim to accelerate his current timetable under the estimated completion of the Seven years Plan in 1967. At this time, South Korea's entrance into the international community signaled that it was not afraid of the North. In 1965, South Korea signed a treaty with Japan, which recognized an independent South Korea. Following normalized relations with Japan, South Korea received investments, loans, and trade, further bolstering South Korea's capacity. In July 1966, South Korea signed the Status of Forces Agreement with the United States. North Korea could no longer wait until 1967 to act.

=== 1966 Workers Party Speech and North Korea's objectives ===
On October 5, 1966, at the Workers' Party of North Korea Conference, Kim delivered a speech signaling his intention to implement armed provocations along the DMZ. The contents of the speech depicted the role of the war in Vietnam as representative of both a changing military landscape in which guerrilla warfare could succeed and as a ripe opportunity to take advantage of South Korea's divided military efforts as well as the divided attention of the U.S. in the East Pacific. The speech reflected North Korea's goals, which aimed to topple Park's administration from the inside, by raising an insurgency through spreading North Korean propaganda. In doing so, North Korea sought to level the playing ground and avoid a war of attrition, one that Kim was sure he would lose, given United States land, air, and sea support to South Korea.

== November 1966–January 1968 conflicts ==
=== DMZ skirmishes and tensions (1966–1967) ===
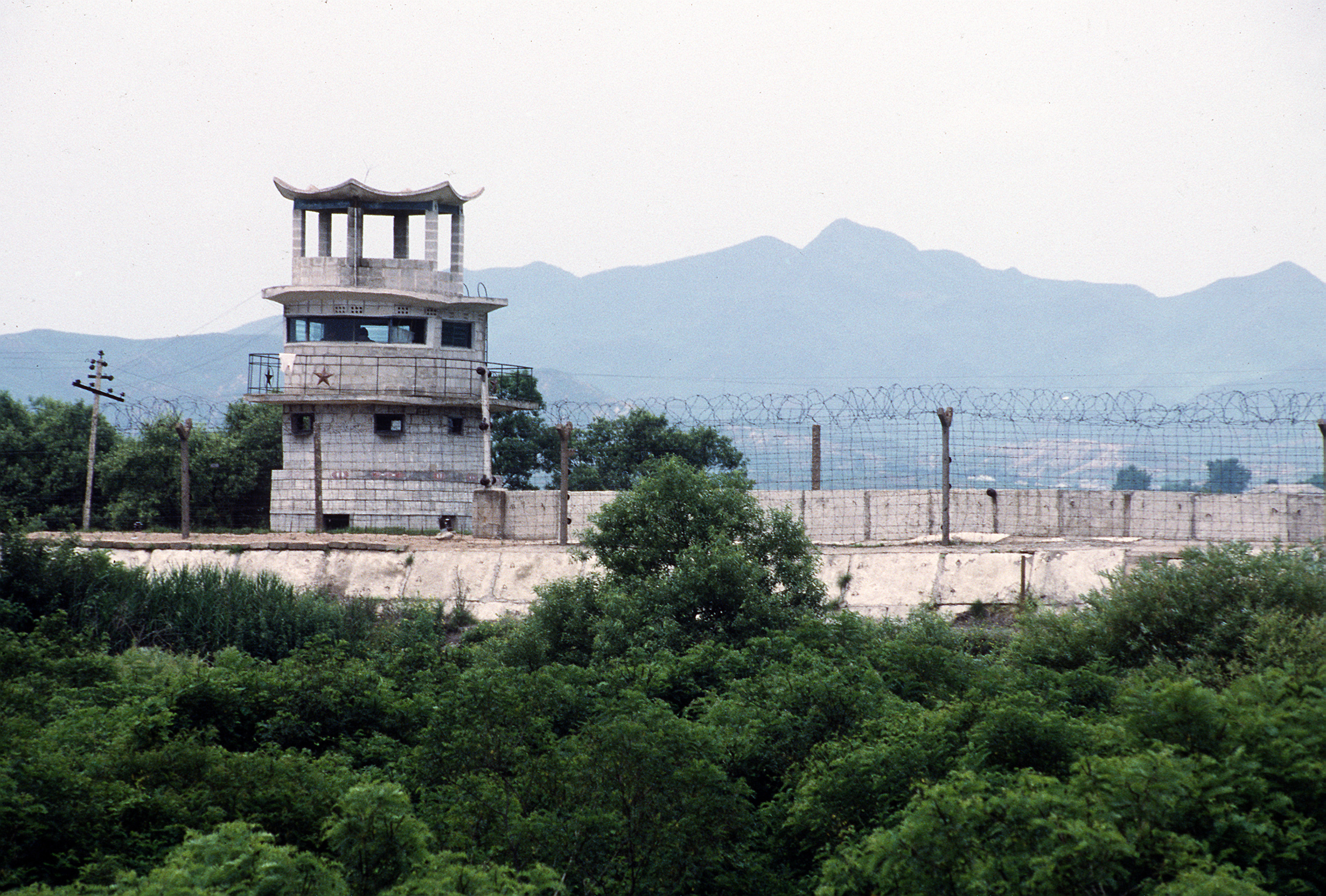
A concrete wall and a guard tower at the Korean Demilitarized Zone

The years of 1966 and 1967 were riddled with a number of low-intensity border skirmishes, which mainly involved coordinated DPRK spy activity along the DMZ (avoiding the American guarded sector) accompanied by several firefights. On November 2, 1966, North Korean forces ambushed the 23rd Infantry Regiment two days after U.S. president Lyndon B Johnson's visit to South Korea. In 1967, the number of incidents increased, but they were of lower magnitude, consisting primarily of brief coordinated ambushes which resulted in casualties from both sides, and the destruction of military property such as jeeps and patrol boats.

The DPRK agents also began sizing up the South Korean defenses in order to lay the groundwork for insurrection. Most belonged to the Reconnaissance General Bureau, an important subdivision under the KWP liaison department responsible for a majority of DMZ activity. These guerrilla agents preferred to strike in the favourable conditions of autumn: the longer nights, dry ground, and fog. Unlike the North, the South possessed no counter-guerrilla units in 1966, although by January 1967, motivated by the "November 2nd incident," General Bonesteel and his personal committee devised a new four-layer anti-infiltration strategy to hamper the DPRK under the Counter Infiltration Guerilla Concepts Requirements Plan of 1967. In terms of sea infiltration, the defense was largely left up to the ROKA, which were uncoordinated and ill-equipped with necessary radio and communications. Meanwhile, while the allies fortified their defenses as best they could, Kim launched a domestic crash program to train elite special warfare units, which would eventually amount to the completion of the all-officer 124th and 283d Army Units in 1968.

However, internal tensions were already mounting between the allies. The South Korean leadership demonstrated aggressive hopes of reunification and an escalation of the conflict. However, Bonesteel, according to the United States priority in Vietnam, remained committed only to defending South Korea against DPRK threats. Bonesteel avoided deploying heavy weaponry and artillery in order to avoid entangling South Koreans in the casualties, which Park viewed as representative of the U.S.' uncommitted nature and indecisiveness. Ultimately, Bonesteel intended to keep the status quo in which South Korea played second fiddle to Vietnam, even if it meant costing lives and suppressing the South Korean leadership, while maintaining unceasing vigilance along the border in case of any further major DPRK attack.

=== Blue House raid and the USS Pueblo incident (1968) ===
In 1966–67, Kim grew increasingly impatient as his unconventional tactics along the DMZ continued to fail in severing the U.S. and South Korea alliance. Bonesteel and Park seemed to be working closer than ever before, showing signs of developing a capable counter-insurgency plan coordinated with information gathered from failed DPRK attacks. As time began to slip, the DPRK made two bold moves on January in 1968.

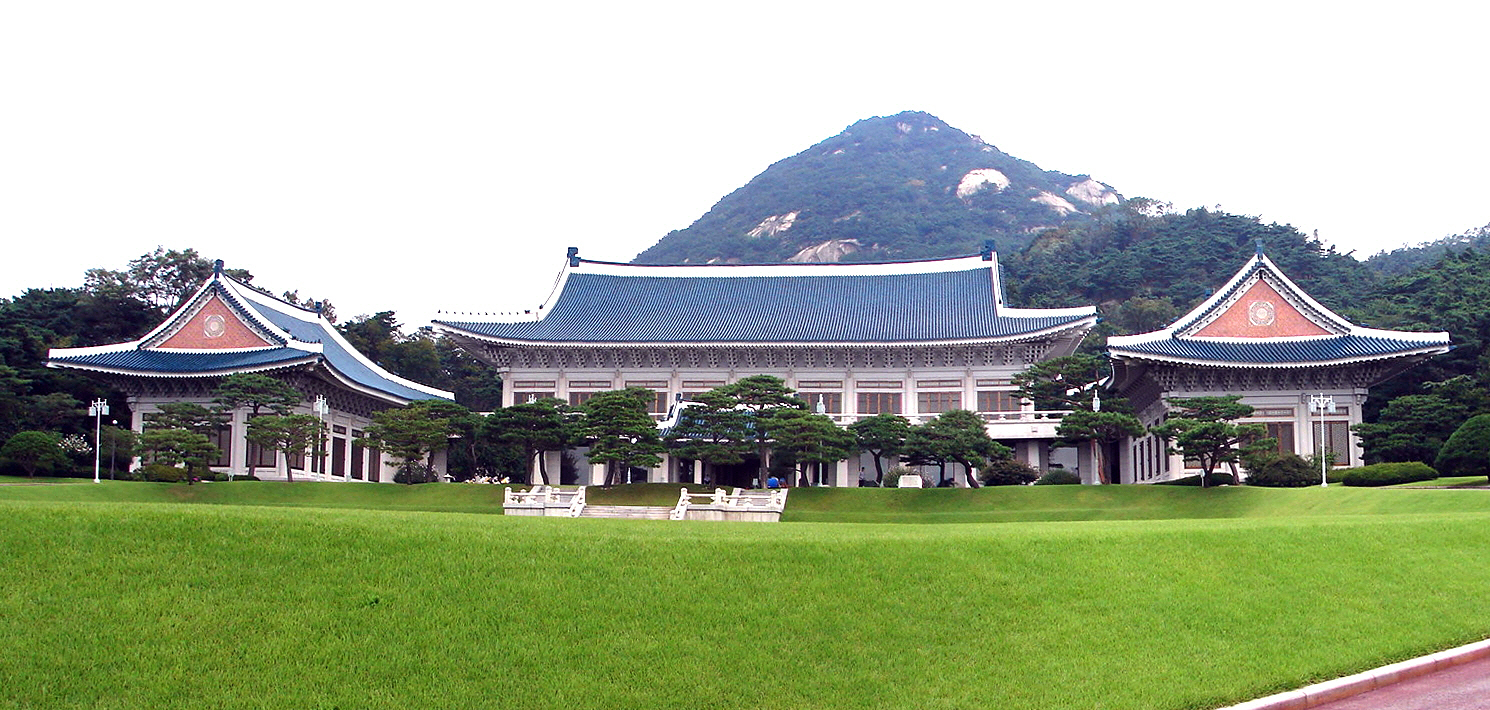
The Blue House

First, Kim ordered a band of DPRK commandos to assassinate Park at the Blue House. By doing so, he hoped to agitate the South Korean people to rise up against their government and the "American imperialists." On the evening of the 17th, they penetrated into the U.S. 2nd Infantry Division sector disguised in ROK army uniforms. For two days and nights, they moved in stealth towards Seoul, but made the mistake of trying to indoctrinate villagers on the 19th, who later notified authorities. The commandos were eventually halted by a police contingent just 800 meters from the presidential house, which prompted a nationwide manhunt. The Blue House raid also coincided with the capture of 82 crew members aboard the USS Pueblo (January 23) by disguised North Korean patrol boats.

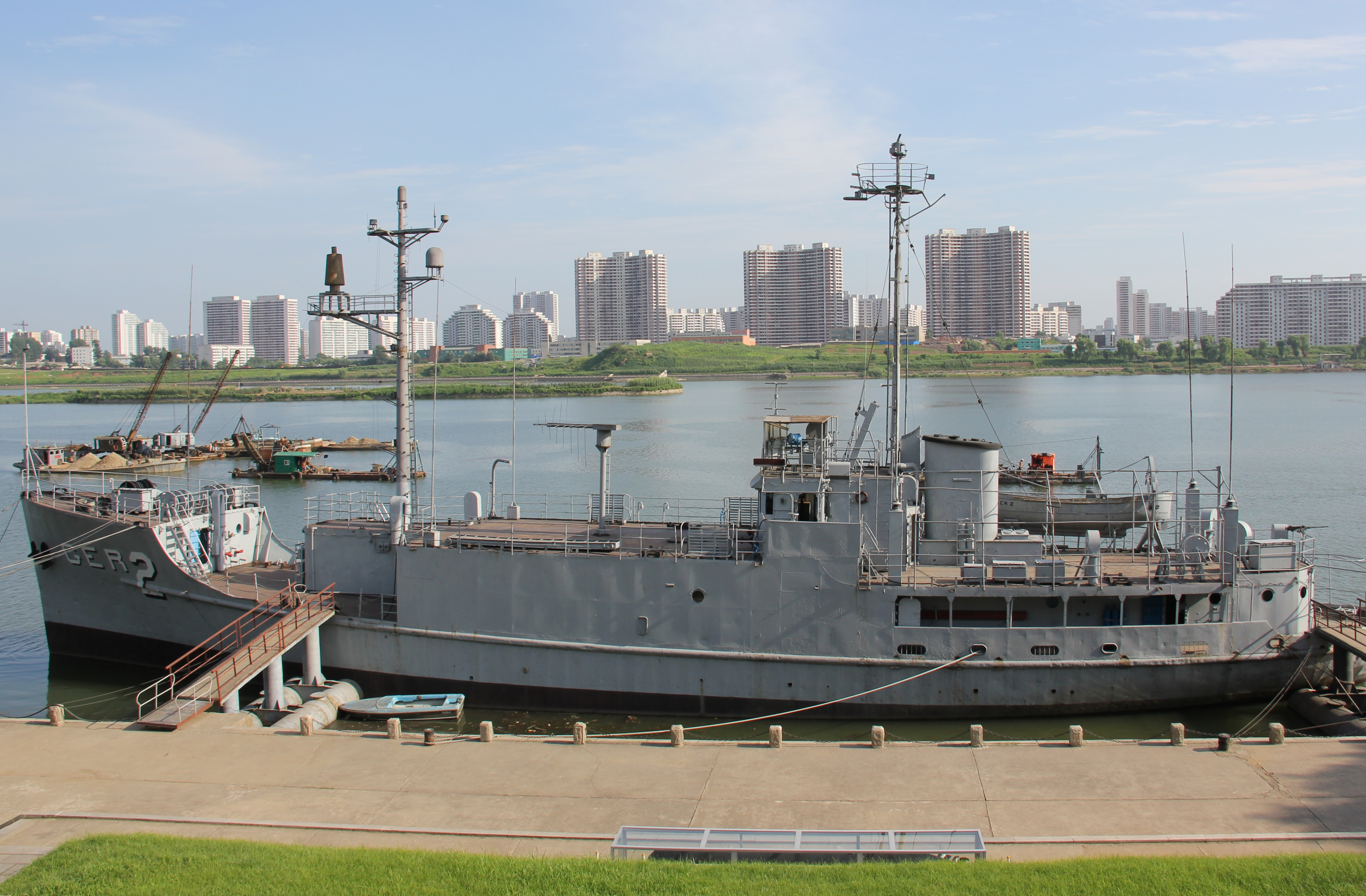
The USS Pueblo on display in North Korea after its capture

These two attacks occurred in tandem with the Tet Offensive in Vietnam, which further burdened the U.S. military effort. Pyongyang welcomed the timing of the Tet Offensive and the sudden seizure of the Pueblo as chances to further dissuade the U.S. from maintaining its presence in South Korea. Meanwhile, the Blue House raid vastly elevated the threat of the DPRK in the eyes of Seoul, but not the U.S., thus threatening to divide the allies. Under these conditions, In the aftermath of January 1968, the U.S.' response was of marked contrast to that of South Korea. President Johnson primarily reacted to the Tet Offensive and the Pueblo incident by ordering Bonesteel to initiate talks with the DPRK through Panmunjom in order to return American hostages.

In comparison, Seoul viewed the Tet Offensive as a sideshow in response to the immense threat of the DPRK, culminating in the creation of Homeland Defense Reserve Forces under Instruction 18. It functioned not only as a militia but also conducted anti-communist education aimed towards rural villagers in order to defeat the indoctrination attempts by the North. The ROK accused the United States of having implemented a policy of appeasement and refused to negotiate with U.S. representatives. However, Park's anger quickly subsided due to fear of losing U.S. backing and an increased flow of military resources into South Korea. By the end of 1968, the DMZ had become increasingly hard to penetrate. However, the same could not be said for the coastal border, where terrain and sub-par technological obstacles provided the DPRK with another avenue of invasion.

== Landings ==
=== Unit 124 landing ===
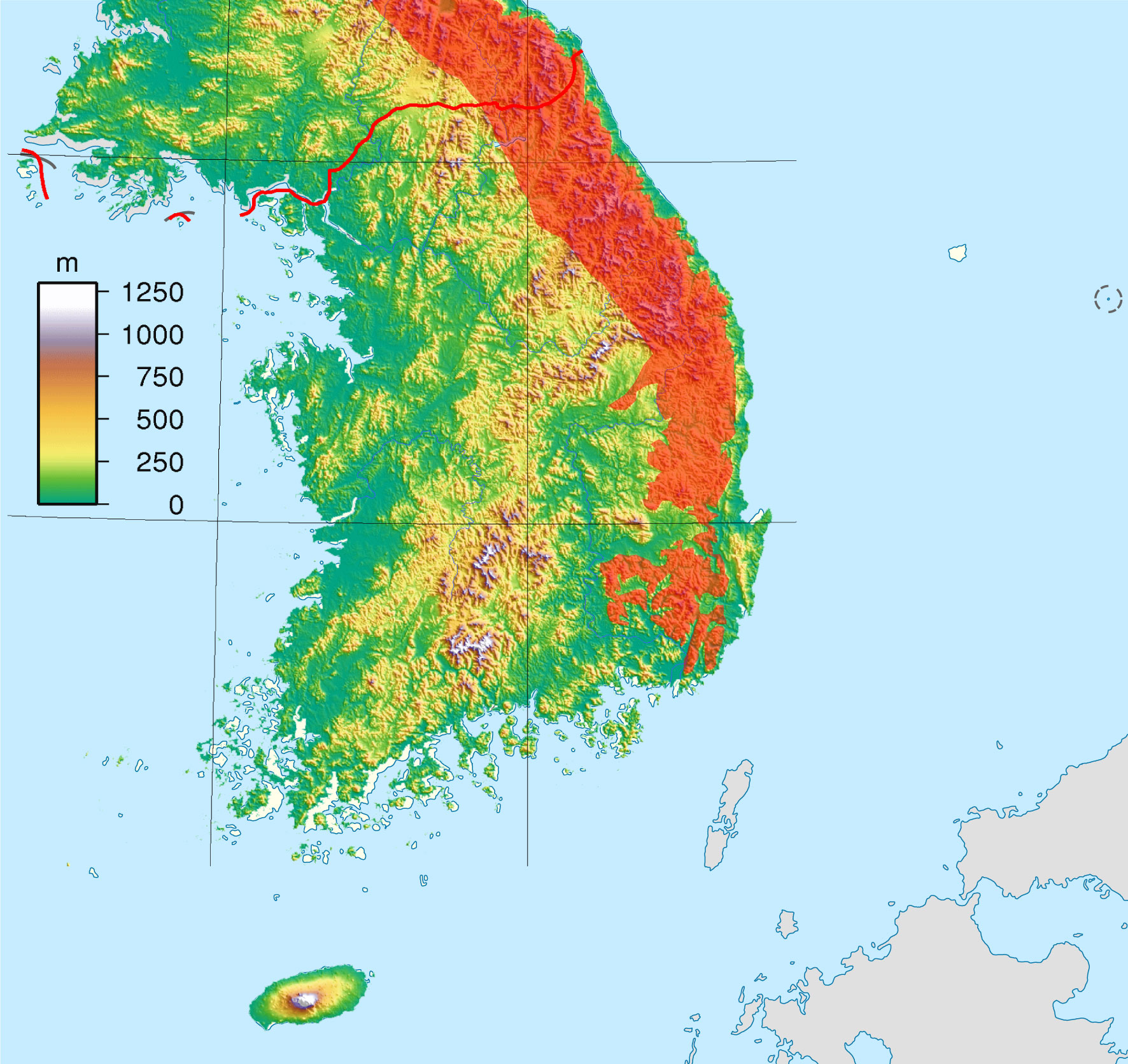
South Korea topography with the Taebaek Mountains marked

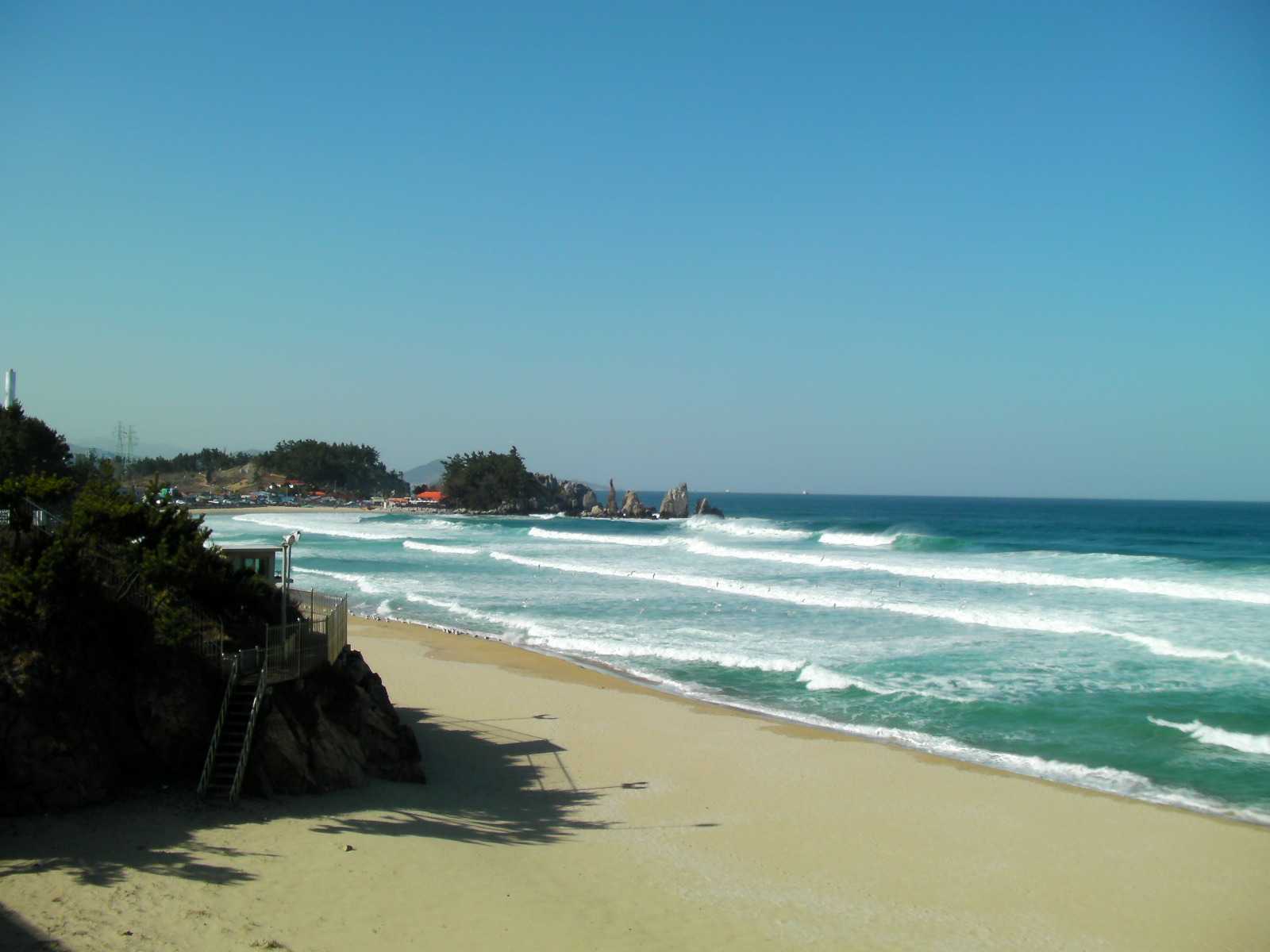
Samcheok Beach, where the Unit 124 commandos landed, in 2009

The Ulchin–Samcheok landings occurred at midnight on October 30, 1968, along the North Gyeongsang Province and Gangwon Province. In total, 120 North Korean commandos were dispatched from Unit 124. The force was organized into three groups, two of which consisted of 30 troops with one group of 60. These groups avoided detection and landed in eight predetermined locations along the eastern seacoast of South Korea, later separating at the Taebaek Mountains. The target landing areas represented vast expanses of relative wilderness and thus were the weakest zones of the already sub-par surveillance net erected by the Allies. However, the plan was drawn without any knowledge that the area had previously hosted a number of Park's anti-communist programmes, one of which was the Medical Enlightenment teams who had educated rural villagers there just months prior.

=== Indoctrination attempt ===
The DPRK prepared to take advantage of social instability, a product of South Korea's economic growth, and part in parcel to Park's rise to power in 1960–61. Kim believed that local, less educated farmers who lived in separation from this new wealth according to traditional, often superstitious lifestyles embodied ripe targets who could easily be indoctrinated according to Juche. The North were also ready to portray the South Korean government as having sold out unification for capitalist resources and economic development, in order to win over their targets by keeping in line with the original concept of reunification.

The DPRK commandos were expecting to be welcomed as long-awaited liberators which led to the conception that indoctrinating South Korean villagers was a readily feasible task. In eight villages, the commandos appeared at daybreak in front of sleepy and confused villagers, dragging them to the local assembly hall to receive lectures and DPRK propaganda. However, the South Koreans were unready to cooperate. Tempers quickly flared and violence broke out. However, amidst the general confusion, word slipped out towards the local police, who alerted the authorities of the invasion.

=== Manhunt ===
South Korean special forces view the bodies of North Korean commandos killed during the manhunt

Upon detection, a 70,000 man ROKA force launched a large-scale operation to apprehend the DPRK commandos. These forces arrived by air, land and sea. Among those deployed were the U.S. 6th Combat Aviation Platoon operating Bell UH-1 Iroquois helicopters summoned by the newly erected U.S.-ROK Operational Planning Staff. The allied counter-infiltration manhunt consisted of thousands of Park's newly created Home Defense Reserves, the 26th Rear Area Security Division, one Republic of Korea Marine Corps battalion and various police companies stationed nearby. Within two weeks, a majority of the commandos were captured or killed, effectively neutralizing the mission. By December 26, Park withdrew the counter-guerrilla alert, signaling the end of the manhunt.

=== Casualties ===
After the operation, the ROK announced that 110 DPRK commandos had been killed, while seven were captured. South Korea sustained 63 deaths, 23 of whom were civilians. The other South Koreans killed included army recruits, reserved police forces and militiamen. The U.S. military sustained three deaths and three wounded.

One notable civilian casualty was 9-year-old Lee Seung-bok at his home in the Gyebang Mountain.

== Aftermath ==
=== Reasons for failure ===
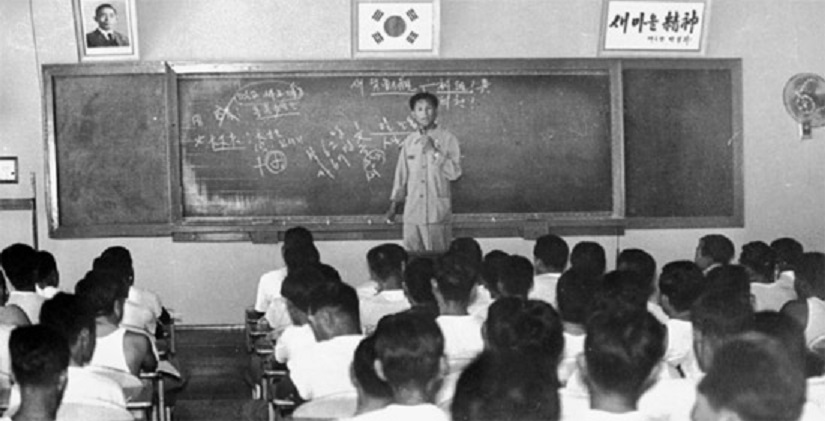
Saemaul Undong

Encouraged by the popularity of the Homeland Reserve Force, Park had decided to launch the "New Community Movement" (Saemaul Undong) to ensure the people's loyalty. Park sought to instill a sense of democracy and nationalism, facilitated by elevating living standards in rural areas under the Korean traditional communalism - Hyangyak and Doorae. The first move embodied the construction of "Reconstruction Villages" by populating areas south of the DMZ with ex-soldiers and their families ready to repel northern infiltrators. Next, Park instituted a civil action program requiring ROK soldiers to build basic infrastructure and schools holding anti-communist classes in rural areas as part of the larger counter-propaganda scheme as well as strengthening ties between the military and villagers.

Under the cover of medical assistance, in various localities soldiers were actually trained members of "Medical Enlightenment" teams, whose purpose was to instill support for Park and cultivate a citizenry ready to dismiss the North's Communist line. Meanwhile, under the inspection of General William P. Yarborough, cooperation between the United States Eighth Army and the Korean Augmentation to the United States Army flourished. A new "Cold War Program" included "Welcome to Korea" classes facilitated by American contributions to social welfare in the form of building schools, visiting orphanages, and conducting cultural exchanges at local universities. Overall, the acceptance of American soldiers by the South Korean populace preemptively dispelled the power of North Korean ideology which characterized American soldiers as violent colonizers and foreign occupiers.

Overall, the DPRK strategy lacked discipline and proper logistics. As a result of Park's aggressive policies which rallied popular participation against the DPRK threat, the public transformed into valuable informants for the government. Under the guidance of the Korean National Intelligence Service (NIS), 132 North Korean spies had already been captured by 1967. The North Korean leadership was ignorant of the extent to which South Korean nationalism and citizens were loyal to Park. Additionally, the lack of consistent major offensives prior to the Ulchin-Samcheok landing allowed for the regrouping and unified deployment of allied resources in the form of effective counterinsurgency measures. Ultimately, the DPRK failed to conduct a series of well-orchestrated strikes aimed at continually whithering down their opponent, which contributed to the mission's failure.

=== Domestic reactions ===
The success in countering the Ulchin-Samcheok landings validated Park's increased security measures and propaganda campaigns. Prior to the landings, Park's anti-ideological campaigns sought to instill a sense of patriotism and loyalty towards the government. Ulchin-Samcheok became proof that those efforts had not been wasted, and moreover deflected suspicion which regarded Parks top-down assimilation of South Korean military forces under a unified chain of command, as a ploy for consolidating personal power. Instead, South Koreans not only felt protected by Park's regime but also that they had contributed in protecting their country. These two factors allowed Park to consolidate his authority in the eyes of the South Korean people.

In contrast, Kim, in light of the massive DPRK failure, scapegoated his generals. The KWP's position was not that the policy was unpopular in the South but rather that it had been implemented incorrectly. Following two years of unsuccessful guerrilla warfare, punishment by death or imprisonment was implemented for senior military officials responsible for failing to implement the party line. Along with the disbandment of Unit 124, several prominent members of the DPRK who also received punishment included the defense minister - General Kim Chong-bong, KPA chairman - General Ho Pong-haek, and KWP secretary - Cho Tong-chol. After the military purge, Kim resumed unified control over military activity by placing the KWP as a political watchdog over the military.

=== Diffusion of conflict ===
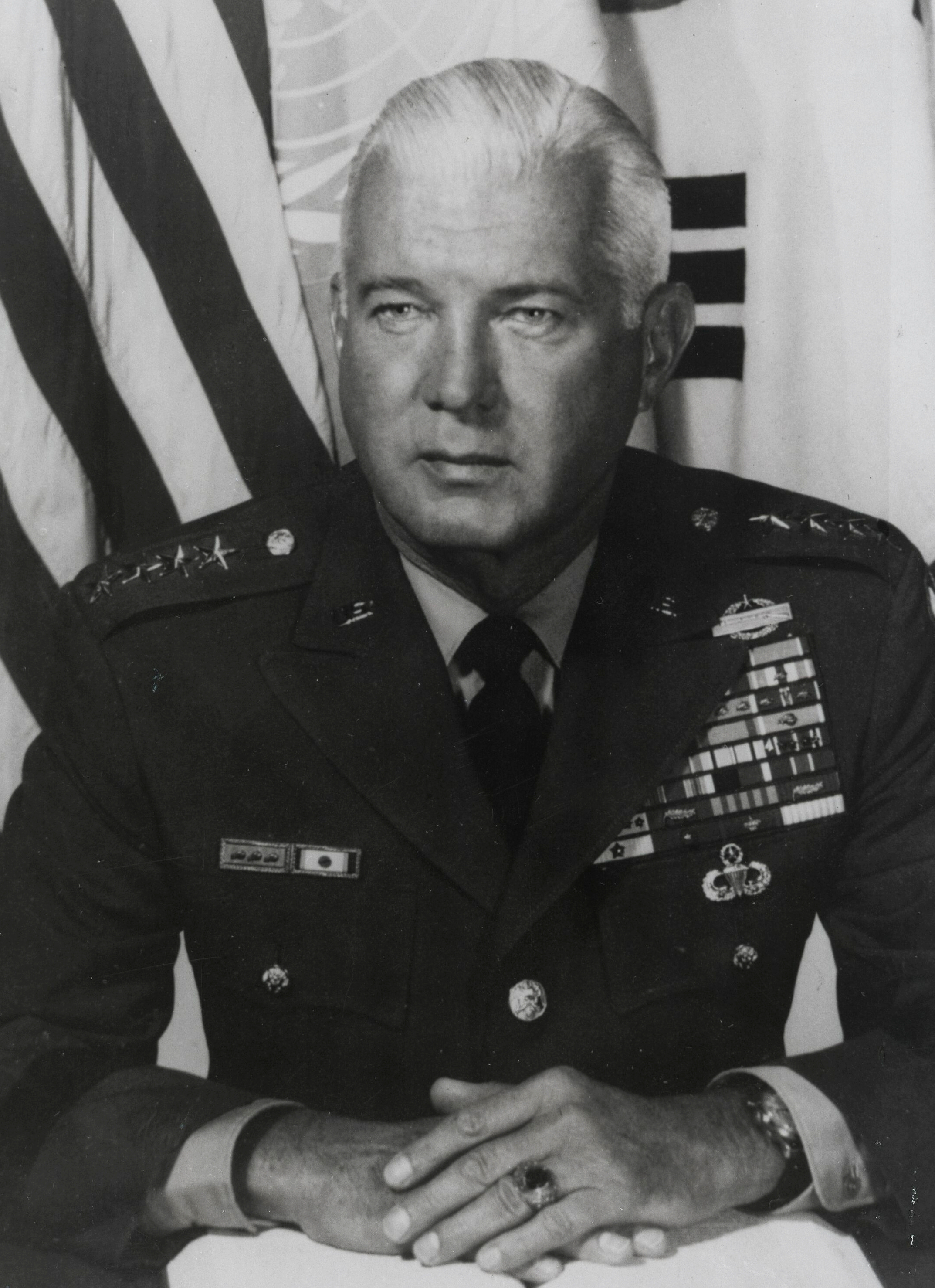
John H. Michaelis

The DPRK's campaign ended in failure. In addition, infighting between Kim's two largest communist benefactors left the DPRK to fend for itself, while the alliance between the U.S. and the ROK gradually strengthened. The loss at Ulchin-Samcheok was the last straw for Kim, who promptly reshuffled the DPRK's ranks and overall military structure. However, these upgrades did not bolster the strength of the DPRK military, nor did it make up for the purge of highly trained and skilled units. By 1969, the DPRK had largely abandoned unconventional warfare, and hostility gradually waned. When KPA forces shot down a U.S. Navy Lockheed EC-121 Warning Star aircraft over the Sea of Japan on April 15 of that year, which were accompanied by several more light skirmishes, these events embodied spurts of overt warfare, rather the steady implementation of highly coordinated and unconventional tactics.

In contrast, allied forces prospered. While the UNC bolstered defenses along the DMZ after Ulchin-Samcheok, the South's economy and population had continued to grow despite DPRK provocations. New security upgrades embodied the steady influx of new military resources such as the usage of powerful F-4D Phantom Jets along the DMZ as well as heightened cooperation between U.S. and ROKA forces. In particular, new ROKA southern and Eastern Coast Security commands were erected to prevent another attempted coastal landing. Between June and December 1969, the ROKA forces scored numerous victories against the dwindling military capacity of the North. Meanwhile, the U.S. Department of Defense formalized the diversion of resources from Korea. Ultimately, the fortification of the border dissuaded further DPRK activity. By 1969, conflicts circulating around the DMZ reduced significantly. Bonesteel's 1969 departure and replacement by General John H. Michaelis on October 1, marked the effective end of the conflict.

=== Post-conflict authoritarianism in South Korea ===
In handling the Korean DMZ conflict of 1966–1969, Park enabled industrial progress while suppressing the rights of the South Korean people. According to Major Daniel P. Bolger's analysis, Park enjoyed the emergency powers at his disposal in the time of conflict, which he preserved until 1979. The military, intelligence and police forces he consolidated in order to defeat the DPRK were re-calibrated towards suppressing human rights, domestic opponents and restricting freedom of speech and press. The adoption of the Yusin Constitution on November 21, 1972, granted Park full control over South Korea by co-opting the rule of law until his assassination in 1979 at the hands of secret service chief Kim Jae-kyu. Some historians argue that the consolidation of the military established under Park paved the way for continued authoritarianism even after Park's death.

== See also ==
- Korean DMZ Conflict (1966–1969)
- 1968 Lee Seung-bok Incident and Controversy
- Blue House raid & Silmido (film)
