= Yongpyeong-myeon =

- Township
- Location of Yongpyeong-myeon in South Korea
- Coordinates: 37°36′23.41″N 128°26′20.89″E
- Country: South Korea
- Province: Gangwon
- County: Pyeongchang
- Administrative divisions: 8 ri

Area
  - Total: 135.43 km^{2} (52.29 sq mi)

Population (2008)
  - Total: 3,129
- Time zone: UTC+9 (Korea Standard Time)

Korean name
- Hangul: 용평면
- Hanja: 龍坪面
- RR: Yongpyeong-myeon
- MR: Yongp'yŏng-myŏn

Yongpyeong-myeon (Korean: 용평면) is a myeon (township) in Pyeongchang county of Gangwon-do South Korea. The myeon is located in northern central part of the county. The total area of Yongpyeong-myeon is 135.43 square kilometers, and, as of 2008, the population was 3,129 people.

== Places of interest ==
- The ski resort of Yongpyong is not located on its territory, but in the township of Daegwallyeong-myeon.
- The Lee Seung-bok Memorial Center is located in Nodong-ri.
