= Pinoy baiting =

Term referencing superficial praises of the Philippines and Filipinos

Pinoy baiting is a phrase that has been used to refer to acts by non-Filipino individuals, usually celebrities or YouTubers, of posting content online purportedly with the intention of getting the attention of Filipinos, by being surprised about the Philippines or its people. Pinoy baiters are defined as giving superficial and allegedly insincere praises and similar reactions that give recognition to the Philippines or its people.

Subsequent responses by Filipinos to what have been referred to as acts of Pinoy baiting have been criticized as a form of cultural cringe. This criticism would subsequently give the advice that Filipinos should not constantly require validation from non-Filipinos about themselves or their country.

== Pinoy baiting mediums ==
=== Reaction videos ===
On social media such as YouTube, channels with specific focus on showing their reaction towards and opinions about certain videos or topics are called reaction channels. Reaction videos are very popular and require minimal effort to create, and thus made it easy for alleged Pinoy baiting to thrive within this video-making genre.

=== Travel vlogs ===
Vlogging, short for video blogging, grew in popularity in the 2020s. Most of the popular alleged Pinoy-baiting channels tend to be vlog channels, normally following the same script under such titles as "The Philippines changed us/me", "First impression of the Philippines", "Is this really Manila?" and "Filipinos are such Kind/Good People!", and made while travelling to touristy areas such as Boracay or Bonifacio Global City and taste-testing the fast food chain Jollibee, among others.

== Criticism of the phrase ==
Philippines-based Korean vlogger Jessica Lee had been accused by some YouTube viewers of engaging in Pinoy baiting.

In a response vlog, Lee acknowledged that there may be individuals engaging in this "business strategy" of gaining views and subscribers from one of the largest communities online. However, she questioned the objectivity of some use of the phrase, citing any vlogging subject as fair game for a negative impression of being a "baiting" tool for the vlogger treating of that subject. She also invoked vloggers' freedom to choose whatever subject they want to talk about in a deep or shallow manner, while enjoining citizens to exercise their free-market right to unfollow vloggers they hate and follow those vloggers that "make them happy". She also gave her critics an explanation why she ended up vlogging about Philippine and Filipino subjects.

== See also ==
- Colonial mentality
- Cultural cringe
- Orientalism
- Postcolonialism
- Self-hatred
- Tall poppy syndrome
