= Anti–North Korean sentiment =

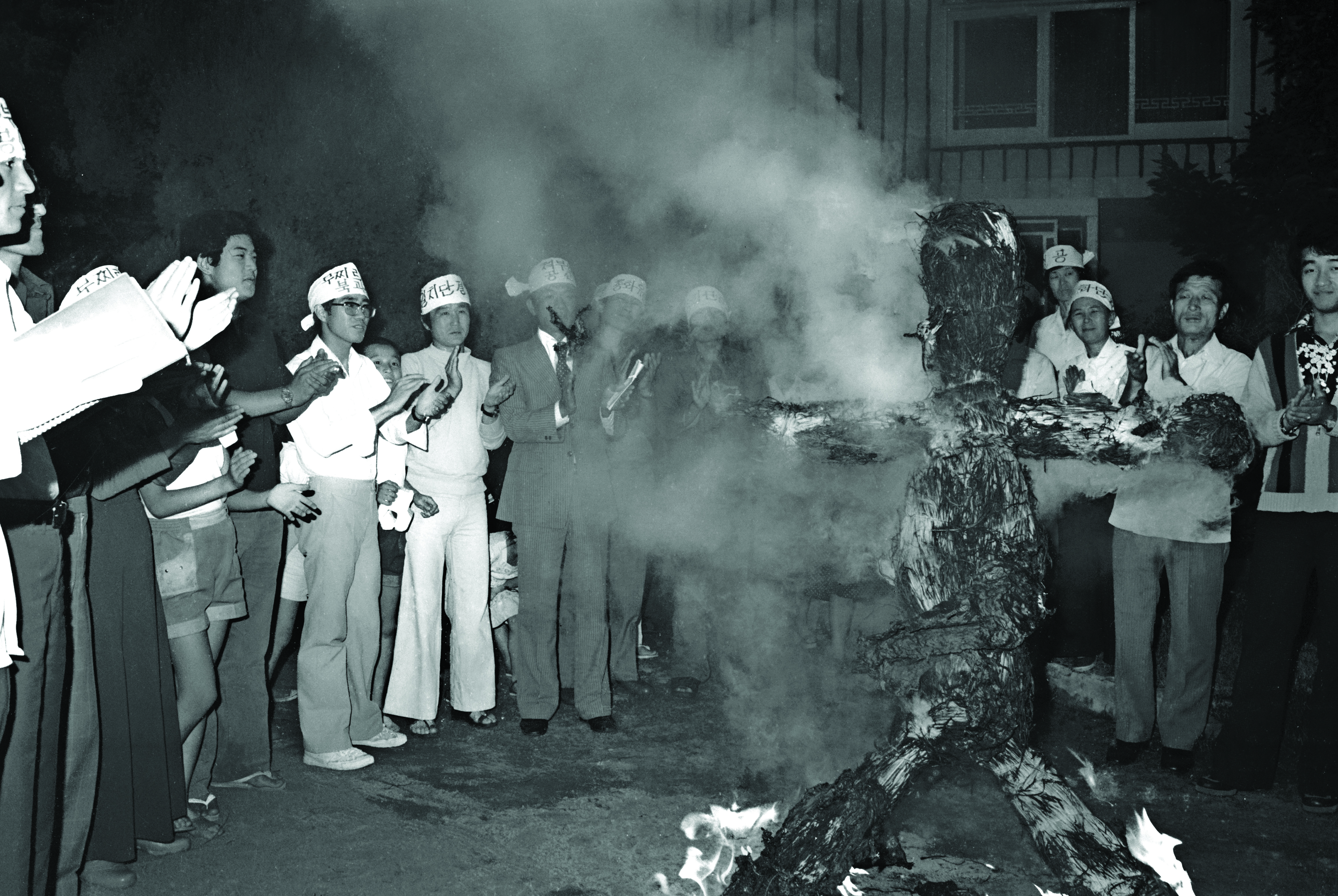
Just after the 1976 Korean axe murder incident, anti-Northern sentiment spiked in South Korea. In this image, South Koreans burn a paper effigy of North Korean leader Kim Il Sung in Seoul (1976)

Anti-North Korean sentiment or anti-Democratic People's Republic of Korea sentiment (simply anti-DPRK sentiment) refers to opposition or hostility towards North Korea. While anti-North Korean or anti-DPRK sentiment are distinct from "anti-Korean sentiment" related to ethnic hostilities, they may also include racist elements such as hostility towards the North Korean people.

In the 21st century, anti-North Korean sentiments stem in large part from the state's nuclear weapons program and a low human rights record.

== Statistics ==
Results of 2017 BBC World Service poll. Views of North Korea's influence by country Sorted by Pos-Neg
Country polled	Positive	Negative	Neutral	Pos-Neg
United States	5%	88%	7	−83
United Kingdom	7%	89%	4	−82
Australia	6%	87%	7	−81
France	9%	85%	6	−76
Canada	10%	81%	9	−71
Spain	5%	75%	20	−70
Greece	6%	64%	30	−58
China	19%	76%	5	−57
Germany	1%	56%	43	−55
Global average	17%	59%	24	−42
Brazil	23%	60%	17	−37
Mexico	24%	54%	22	−30
Peru	22%	51%	27	−29
Indonesia	17%	46%	37	−29
India	19%	40%	41	−21
Turkey	34%	44%	22	−10
Russia	20%	30%	50	−10
Nigeria	33%	42%	21	−9
Kenya	27%	36%	37	−9
Pakistan	20%	25%	55	−5

== By region ==
=== China ===
When the Cultural Revolution broke out, Ethnic Koreans were slaughtered in Yanbian in 1967 by Red Guards who threw their corpses into trains to North Korea.

China temporarily participates in official U.N. sanctions on North Korea but balances enforcement with strategic interests, which affects the effectiveness of international measures.

=== Japan ===
There is also much concern in Japan regarding North Korea and its nuclear and long-range missile capabilities, as a result of missile tests in 1993, 1998 and 2006 and an underground nuclear test in 2006. There are also controversies regarding North Korean abductions of Japanese, where Japanese citizens were abducted by North Korean agents during the 1970s and 1980s.

A Zainichi organisation which has strong ties to the DPRK, Chongryon, is commonly accused of providing funding and material to North Korea and indoctrinating the Zainichi Korean population to actively hate Japan.

According to a 2014 BBC World Service Poll, Japanese people alike hold the largest anti–North Korean sentiment in the world, with 91% negative views of North Korea's influence, and with only 1% positive view making Japan the third country with the most negative feelings of North Korea in the world, after South Korea and the United States.

=== South Korea ===
In South Korea, hostility toward North Korea is called anti-North sentiment (Korean: 반북감정; RR: banbuk gamjeong) and is commonly associated with right-leaning politics. According to a 2014 BBC World Service poll, 3% of South Koreans viewed North Korea's influence positively, with 91% expressing a negative view, making South Korea, after Japan, the country with the most negative feelings of North Korea in the world.

==== Discrimination against North Korean defectors ====
As of 2023, there are around 33,000 North Korean defectors in South Korea. They have widely and consistently reported experiencing discrimination. Areas of discrimination include but are not limited to employment discrimination, social isolation, and difficulty finding spouses. Some South Koreans even admit to avoiding businesses owned by North Korean defectors.

According to a 2012 study, North Korean men have greater difficulty than North Korean women in finding a spouse. A 2015 paper highlighted the tendency of a South Korean variety show, Now On My Way to Meet You, to disproportionately present North Korean women as attractive marriage partners.

=== United States ===
Following North Korea's heavy re-militarization and a series of missile tests, Americans were conditioned to fear a possible attack by a "rogue state" such as North Korea. In United States President George W. Bush's State of the Union Address on January 29, 2002, he described North Korea as a part of the "Axis of evil". Following the development of the nuclear program of North Korea and the 2006 North Korean nuclear test, the United States imposed UN sanctions on North Korea. These economic sanctions are very unlikely to be lifted by the United States due to North Korea's noncompliance with the six-party talk agreements.

From 1988 until 2008, and since November 2017, North Korea has been designated a state sponsor of terrorism for supporting Hamas and Hezbollah against Israel, their role in the murder of Kim Jong-nam, supporting dictator Bashar al-Assad in the Syrian Civil War, close relationships with Iran, and the suspicious death of Otto Warmbier.

== Derogatory terms ==
=== In Korean ===
- Ppalgaengi (빨갱이) – meaning literally "little red", has similar connotation to the word "commie" in English. Used in South Korea to pejoratively refer to either North Koreans or any left-leaning person.

== See also ==
- Anti–People's Republic of China sentiment
- Anti–South Korean sentiment
- Media coverage of North Korea
- Pro–North Korean sentiment
