= Gaoli bangzi =

Chinese slur for Korean people

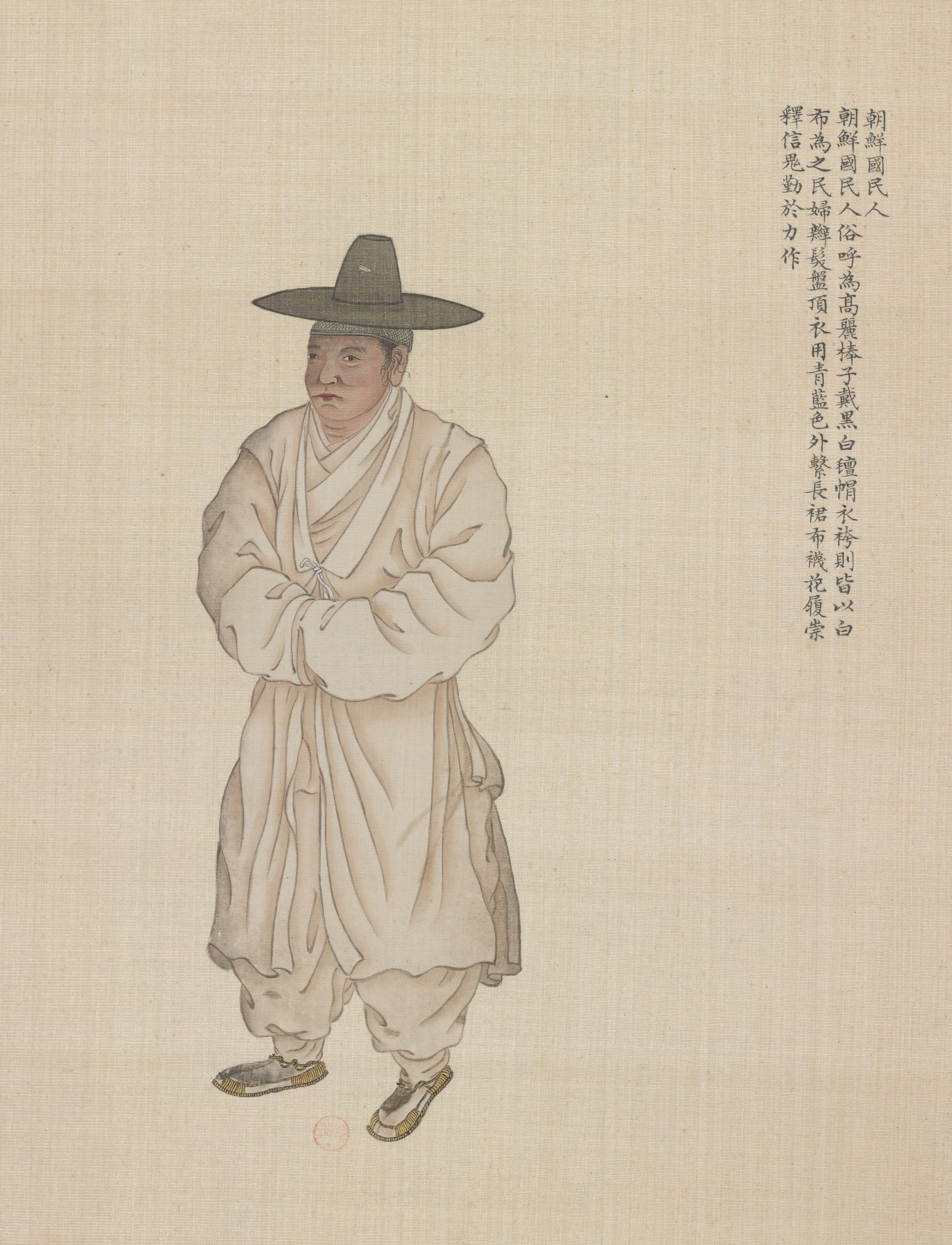
The 1751 Huangqing Zhigongtu states that Joseon commoners were colloquially known as Gaoli bangzi (高麗棒子).

Gaoli bangzi (Chinese: 高麗棒子; pinyin: gāolí bàngzi; lit. 'Korean Stick') is a Chinese slang term, with a long history of being used as an ethnic slur for Koreans. The term gaoli (高麗) refers to the ancient Korean dynasty Goryeo, while bangzi (棒子) means 'Stick'. It is used synonymously with han bangzi (韓棒子) or simply bangzi (棒子).

== Origin ==
Huang Puji of the Nanjing University Department of History argues that the term originated as the Korean word bangza, written "幫子" in Korean sources, referring to the nobi servants that accompanied Korean diplomatic missions to China in large numbers during the Ming and Qing Dynasties, but this mistakenly became corrupted as "棒子", a term which differs only in tone. These poverty-stricken servants had apparently gained a reputation for petty crimes such as smuggling, according to the diary of Korean scholar Kim Chang-eop (金昌業). and subsequently its usage expanded to refer to all Koreans in Chinese public perception.

One incorrect belief is that the term originated from the baton-wielding Korean parapolice guards during the Japanese occupation of Manchuria. According to this account, the Japanese distrusted the Korean guards and did not issue them firearms, only allowing them to equip themselves with the bangmangi washing paddles commonly found in Korean households. The guards often enjoyed teasing Chinese people and beating them with batons, earning enmity among the Chinese populace. However, the use of this slang term has been seen as early as the reign of the Kangxi Emperor two centuries before, so this explanation does not stand up to scrutiny. At present the exact origin of "Gaoli Bangzi" remains uncertain.

The term's earliest mention in writing is in the 1722-published Chinese journal Liaozuo Jianwenlu (遼左見聞錄) by Chinese traveller Wang Yiyuan, which recorded that the lower class in Korea, specifically citing the children of prostitutes, were referred to as "Bangzi".

The term 幫子 was also used this way to refer to the embassy's servantry by Hong Dae-yong (Korean: 홍대용; Hanja: 洪大容) in the diary of his visit to China Eul-byeong Yeon-haeng-log (을병연행록; 乙丙燕行錄).

== Usage ==
In the First Volume of the Qianlong period court document Huangqing Zhigongtu (皇清職貢圖, literally "Portraits of Periodical Offering of the Qing"), the entry regarding Koreans includes the statement: "朝鮮國民人，俗呼為高麗棒子。" (Joseon commoners, colloquially referred to as Goryeo bangzi)

Terry Gou, the chairman of Foxconn referred to Koreans as gaoli bangzi in the general meeting of shareholders on 18 June 2012.

Shandong people are also being called Bangzi as Shandong Bangzi (山東棒子). In this context in Mandarin, Bangzi means people who is stubborn, rigid and hard as a stick/rod.

In the Chinese animated series Year Hare Affair where countries are depicted as anthropomorphic characters, both South Korea and North Korea are depicted as anthropomorphic sticks (bangzi) with South differentiated with US-style combat helmet and North with Communist-style red star cap.

== See also ==
- Er guizi
- Anti-Korean sentiment in China
