= Lee Seung-bok =

South Korean murdered by North Korean Commandos

- 이승복
- Statue of Lee Seung-bok in Pyeongchang
- Born: 9 December 1959; North of Gyebangsan
- Died: 9 December 1968 (aged 9)
- Cause of death: Murdered by North Korean commandos
- Resting place: Nodong-ri, Yongpyeong-myeon, Pyeongchang, South Korea

Lee Seung-bok (Korean: 이승복; 9 December 1959 – 9 December 1968) was a 9-year-old South Korean boy who was murdered, along with three members of his family, by North Korean commandos in the aftermath of the Uljin–Samcheok Landings. His murder was widely publicized in South Korea. In the early 1990s, false rumours began to circulate that Lee had never existed and that his death was the creation of South Korean propaganda.

== Early life ==
Lee Seung-bok was the second of four children born to Lee Seok-woo and Joo Dae-ha. He was raised on their farm in a remote area north of Gyebangsan.

== Death ==
On the night of 30 October 1968, 120 members of a Special Battalion of the Korean People's Army landed at 8 separate locations between Ulchin and Samcheok in Gangwon Province and moved inland on a 30-day mission to create guerilla bases in the Taebaek Mountains. On the morning of 31 October, they entered several villages and began indoctrinating the villagers, several of whom slipped away to alert the authorities. Republic of Korea Army forces soon arrived in the area and began hunting down the infiltrators.

On the night of 9 December several North Korean commandos burst into the Lee household demanding food and shelter. The North Koreans asked Lee Seung-bok if he preferred North Korea or South Korea. When he replied that he preferred South Korea, the North Koreans began to beat him. Lee then said "I hate Communists," which enraged the North Koreans who proceeded to kill Lee, his mother Joo Dae-ha (33), younger brother Lee Seung-su (7) and younger sister Lee Seung-Ja (4). Lee's father Lee Seok-woo and older brother Lee Hak-gwan managed to escape from the house and raise the alarm. The North Koreans proceeded to mutilate Lee Seung-bok's face by giving him a half Glasgow smile. The perpetrators fled the house and were never identified, but they may have been among the 113 members of the Special Battalion killed by South Korean forces.

After his death, as part of the government's anti-communist education, the incident was included in Moral textbooks for elementary schools accompanied with a blurred picture of the body. His statue was erected in elementary schools across South Korea, and there were mandatory school trips to the Lee Seung-bok Memorial Center in Pyeongchang. In 1982, he was posthumously awarded the Order of Civil Merit by then-President Chun Doo-hwan. Beginning from the 1990s, as the government changed its education objectives, most of the statues were removed from schools, and information about the incident was reduced in textbooks until it was completely removed in 1995.

== Conspiracy theory ==
In the early 1990s, rumours began to circulate that Lee never existed and the story of his murder had been created by propaganda units of the South Korean military governments. In July 1999, prosecutors charged Kim Ju-eon, the former general secretary of the People's Coalition for Media Reform with defamation after he included the 11 December 1968 The Chosun Ilbo report, entitled, "I Don't Like the Communist Party. A Young Mouth of Resistance Torn," in an "Exhibition of Misreporting" and called the reports of the incident a lie. In September 2002, Kim was found guilty and was sentenced to 6 months in prison. In October 2004, the Seoul Central District Court sentenced Kim to six months prison and two years probation for "spreading false facts" and concluded that the incident had taken place and that the media reports at the time were accurate.

== Memorials ==
The memorial in Nodong-ri

The Lee Seung-bok Memorial Center (Korean: 이승복 기념관) was established in 1982 south of Lee's home in Nodong-ri, Gangwon, South Korea (37°40′19.69″N 128°27′46.05″E). The memorial center contains a memorial hall showing photos and paintings of Lee's life, death and burial. The Lee family house was moved to the park from Gyebang Mountain. An outdoor static park contains a Northrop F-5, a Cessna O-1, an M4 Sherman and various artillery pieces. The graves of Lee and his family are located within the park area.
