= Republic of China (disambiguation) =

The Republic of China, also known as Taiwan, is a country in East Asia.

Republic of China may also refer to:

- Republic of China (1912–1949), a state in East Asia from the end of the Qing dynasty to the end of the Chinese Civil War, which ruled mainland China before 1949 and Taiwan after 1945
- Republic of China calendar
- Fujian People's Government, officially the People's Revolutionary Government of the Republic of China

== See also ==
- China, officially the People's Republic of China
- ROC (disambiguation)
