= Anti-Korean sentiment in Japan =

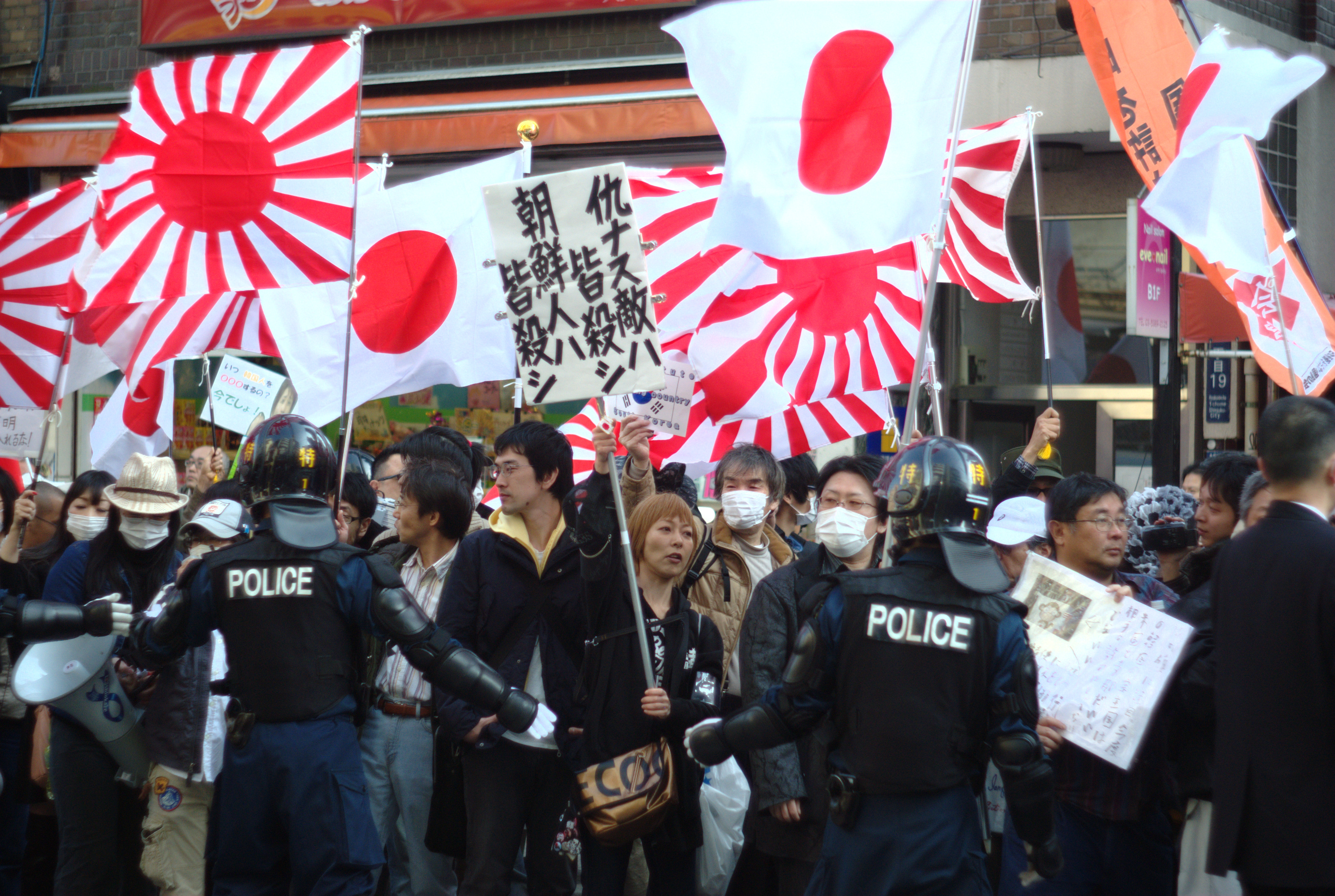
A demonstration by Zaitokukai against Koreans in Japan took place in Tokyo, 2013. A woman carries a placard written "Kill all Koreans".

Anti-Korean sentiment in Japan refers to opposition, hostility, hatred, distrust, fear, and other negative attitudes towards Korean people or culture in Japan. Relations between Japan and Korea date back nearly two millennia and have included cultural exchange, trade, and periods of conflict, with wars and political disputes described as contributing to later negative sentiment. Much of the current anti-Korean sentiment stems from Japanese conservative politicians and far-right groups.

== Ancient era ==
Relations between ancient Japan and Korea date back to at least the fourth century according to historical records of ancient China, Japan, and Korea. The Book of Sui reported that Silla and Baekje greatly valued relations with the Kofun-period Wa of Japan and made diplomatic efforts to maintain these relations. The Samguk sagi (Chronicles of the Three Kingdoms) showed that Baekje and Silla sent princes to the Yamato court as hostages in exchange for military assistance in their campaigns; King Asin of Baekje sent his son Jeonji in 397, and King Silseong of Silla sent his son Misaheun in 402. The chronicles also report that Hogong, from Japan, helped found Silla. According to the Nihon Shoki, Silla was invaded by an army from Wa (Japan) in the third century. The Gwanggaeto Stele records that the king of Goguryeo assisted Silla when it was invaded and punished Baekje for its alliance with Wa, noting additional Wa expeditions in the early fifth century.

During the Mongol conquests of the 13th and 14th centuries, the Goryeo dynasty of Korea became a vassal state. Under Mongolian influence, Korean envoys were sent to Japan to declare submission to the Mongols but were rejected. In response, the emperor Kublai Khan launched two separate invasions in 1274 and 1281. Although both attempts to conquer Japan failed, anti-Korean sentiment had risen due to the major involvement of Korean troops participating in the invasion.

During the Joseon period, Japanese pirates known as wokou repeatedly raided Korean coastal settlements. In 1592, Toyotomi Hideyoshi ordered an invasion of Korea, starting the Imjin Wars, in which Japanese samurai occupied most of the Korean peninsula before withdrawing in 1598. During the withdrawal, the Japanese took a number of Korean craftsmen.

== 19th-20th century ==
During the Meiji Restoration, Japan implemented Western-style reforms and increased its military influence in Qing China, whose prior defeats by Western powers and associated treaties had limited its capacity to oppose Japanese initiatives. As Korea was a tributary state of China at the time, Japan used military force and diplomatic pressure to secure the 1876 Treaty of Gangwha in which Korea granted extraterritorial rights to Japanese citizens in the country; opened the ports of Busan, Incheon, and Wonsan to foreign trade; and established independence from China in conducting foreign relations. Over the following decades, the Empire of Japan restricted other foreign influence in Korea and formally annexed the country in 1910. Japan maintained control of Korea until the end of World War II in 1945. Discussions of later anti‑Korean sentiment in Japan and anti‑Japanese sentiment in Korea relate these attitudes to the period of colonial rule, policies of assimilation and coercion, and disputes over historical interpretation and responsibility.

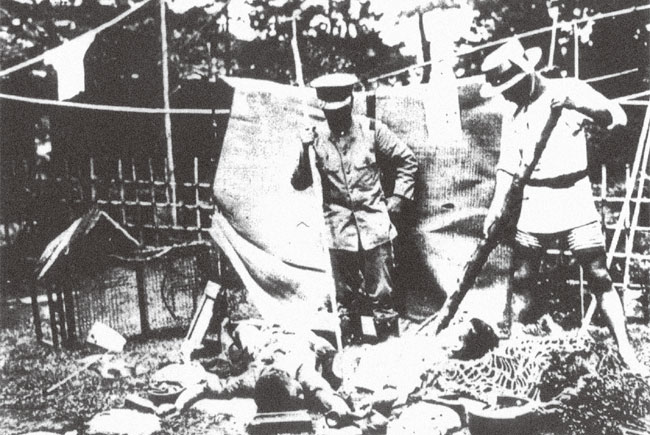
Koreans in Japan about to be stabbed by Japanese vigilantes with bamboo spears immediately after the 1923 Great Kantō earthquake (see Kantō Massacre)

During the 1923 Great Kantō earthquake, widespread damage occurred in areas of the Kantō region where many Korean residents lived, and rumors spread in local Japanese communities that Koreans were poisoning wells and committing arson. This led to the killing of more than 6,000 Koreans in the area, as well as several hundred Chinese and Japanese mistaken for Koreans. Japanese would use the shibboleth of ba bi bu be bo (ばびぶべぼ) to distinguish ethnic Koreans from Japanese, as it was assumed that Koreans would be unable to pronounce the line correctly, and instead pronounce them as [pa, pi, pu, pe, po]. Other shibboleths used were "jū-go-en, go-jū-ssen" (15円 50銭; 15 yen, 50 sen) and "gagigugego" (がぎぐげご), where Japanese people pronounce the initial g as [ɡ] and medial g as [ŋ], whereas Koreans pronounce the two sounds as [k] and [ɡ], respectively.

== Post-WWII history ==
After the end of World War II, Japanese politicians accused the Korean (and Taiwanese) minority in Japan of "insolence," bullying the Japanese, running the black market, counterfeiting currency, spreading disease, and other criminal activities. These politicians painted the minorities as a "menace" and a "source of social disorder." The accusations led to violent mob actions against Koreans in Japan.

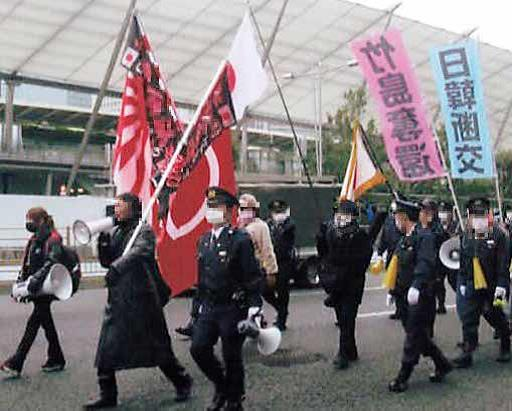
Right wing demonstration criticizing South Korea over the Liancourt Rocks dispute in February 2022

In April 2014, several anti-Korean stickers were found posted at 13 locations along the Shikoku Pilgrimage route; the stickers were denounced by a spokesman from the Shikoku 88 Temple Pilgrimage Association.

In 2021, a Japanese man set fire to an empty house in a Korean village in Utoro district, Uji. The fire spread to other properties and damaged them. He attributed his actions to his hatred of the Korean people which was in part sparked by online rhetoric. He was sentenced to four years in prison.

=== North Korea ===
There are concerns in Japan regarding North Korea and its nuclear and long-range missile capabilities as the result of missile tests in 1993, 1998 and 2006 and an underground nuclear test in 2006. There are also controversies regarding North Korean abductions of Japanese, where Japanese citizens were abducted by North Korean agents during the 1970s and 1980s.

Chongryon, the North Korea-affiliated organization for ethnic Koreans in Japan, has continually drawn controversy from the Japanese public.

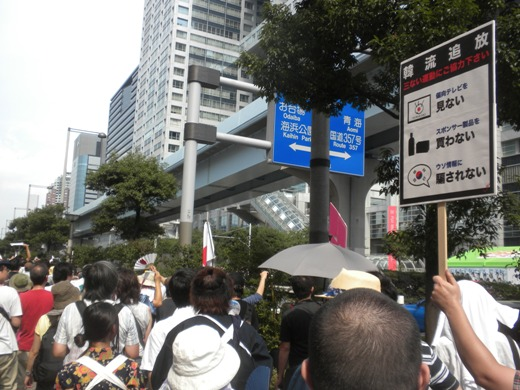
"Anti-Korean Wave" protest against Fuji Television's broadcasting of Korean media in Odaiba, Tokyo, 2011 (Fuji TV protest demonstration).

=== South Korea ===
During the 2002 FIFA World Cup, Japanese and Korean supporters clashed with one another. Both sides were known to post racist messages against each other on online bulletin boards. There were disputes on host selection as a result of the rivalry between the two nations.

The Korean Wave, or the exportation of South Korean pop culture, has created negative feelings among pockets of Japanese society. Many Japanese citizens with conservative views and some right-wing nationalist groups have organized anti–Korean Wave demonstrations via 2channel. On 9 August 2011, more than 2,000 people protested against the broadcasting of Korean dramas in front of Fuji TV's headquarters in Odaiba, Tokyo. In July 2011, Japanese former actor Sousuke Takaoka was fired from his agency, Stardust Promotion, for tweeting criticisms against the influx of Korean dramas. The general perception of Koreans on 2channel is negative, with users depicting them as violent, unethical, and irrational people who are a "threat" to Japan. Users often reference stereotypes of Koreans, such as the use of dogs in Korean cuisine.

The United States Institute of Peace analyzed that the dispute between Japan and South Korea results from anti-Korean xenophobia. According to their analysis, Japan's repeated historical negativism, territorial disputes, and failure of diplomatic agreements are also manifestations of anti-Korean xenophobia.

==== Kenkan ====
In Japanese bookstores, kenkan (Japanese: 嫌韓; "Hatred for [South] Koreans") is recognized as a book genre. There are no hyomil (혐일; 嫌日; lit. 'Hatred for Japanese') books in South Korean bookstores; there is a segment for books specifically covering Korea under colonial rule. Kenkan books grew in numbers during 2012 but slowly disappeared after a law countering hate speech was enacted in 2016.

== Historical revisionism ==
The South Korean media has accused Japanese people of continuing to support historical revisionism against Korean victims and apologizing only to Chinese victims with regard to Japanese war crimes committed during World War II.

=== Comfort women issue ===
Several South Korean media have criticized that, except for some left-wing socialist political parties (mainly Social Democratic Party and Japanese Communist Party), major Japanese politicians and political parties often have historical revisionist perceptions of the comfort women issue. Fumio Kishida called on the German government to remove the Statue of Peace in Berlin, which has caused considerable controversy in South Korea. The Constitutional Democratic Party of Japan and the Liberal Democratic Party have called on the South Korean government to remove the Statue of Peace, with some suggesting that there was no evidence to indicate that Japanese authorities coerced Korean women into sexual slavery. In 2015, the Japanese Ministry of Foreign Affairs claimed that the issue was settled after talks between the ministers of foreign affairs on both sides; this was overturned in 2017, when President Moon Jae-in claimed that the agreement does not settle the issue.

=== Japanese textbook revisionism ===
On 26 June 1982, the textbook screening process in Japan came under scrutiny when the Japanese media and its neighboring countries covered the changes required by the Minister of Education. Experts from the ministry sought to soften textbook references to Japanese aggression before and during World War II. For example, the Japanese invasion of China in 1937 was modified to "advance". Passages described the Japanese atrocities during the fall of Nanking as a result of Chinese provocations. Pressure from China led the Ministry of Education to adopt a new authorization criterion—the "Neighboring Country Clause" (近隣諸国条項)—stating: "textbooks ought to show understanding and seek international harmony in their treatment of modern and contemporary historical events involving neighboring Asian countries."

In 2006, Japanese textbooks stated that the Liancourt Rocks were Japanese territory. This island is disputed territory claimed by both Japan and South Korea. On 9 May 2007, The head of the South Korean Ministry of Education Kim Shin-il sent a letter of protest to Bunmei Ibuki, the Minister of Education. In a speech marking the 88th anniversary of the March First Independence Movement, South Korean President Roh Moo-hyun called for Japan to correct its school textbooks on topics ranging from the "inhumane rape of comfort women" to "the Korean ownership of the Liancourt Rocks". The Liberal Democratic Party, notably the Shinzo Abe administration, has been criticized for historical revisionism tendencies. The Japanese Society for Historical Studies has criticized the party's intervention against textbook writers and its ban on words and phrases such as "comfort women".

== Politics ==
Many major South Korean media outlets point out that the Liberal Democratic Party and its politicians express anti-Korean sentiment and that the party's main support base is "hatred for [South] Koreans".

A Japanese right-wing group known as Zaitokukai is organized by members on the internet and has led street demonstrations against Korean schools.

On 27 March 2010, the centennial of Japan–Korean annexation, Yukio Edano, the Japanese Minister of State for Government Revitalization at the time, stated that "The invasion and colonization and China and Korea were historically inevitable...since China and Korea could not modernize themselves." Yukio Edano is known as a liberal politician in Japan.

In the South Korean media, most Japanese people and almost all major Japanese media criticize the view of South Korean politics for being biased and for portraying or loathing South Korean liberals in a negative way. (Note: Most South Korean liberals take the view that the Japanese government should provide proper individual compensation for the South Korean victims of Japanese war crimes. In contrast, many Japanese take the view that the compensation issue has already been closed due to the Treaty on Basic Relations Between Japan and the Republic of Korea. This is an element of the Japan-Korea conflict.) Korean media claims that, the Asahi Shimbun, known in Japan as a Japanese liberal media outlet, reports on the South Korean liberal Moon Jae-in government using biased and insulting expressions.

According to Michael J. Green in January 2022, presidential candidates in the 2022 South Korean presidential election are willing to improve relations with Japan, but Japanese political leaders have analyzed that they are not.

== See also ==
- Anti-Chinese sentiment in Japan
- History of Japan–Korea relations
- Japan–Korea disputes
- Racism in Japan
