= Conservatism in Japan =

Conservatism in Japan (Japanese: 保守主義, romanized: hoshu shugi) is the dominant ideology of the country's post-war politics, notably through the establishment of the "1955 System" under the Liberal Democratic Party (LDP). Since its inception in 1955, the LDP has been a dominant force in Japanese politics, embodying the party's conservative policies and shaping the country's governance for much of the post-war era.

Mainstream contemporary Japanese conservatives largely believe in stances such as revising the Constitution and a pro-United States foreign policy, while some hold positions including calls for remilitarization and a stronger foreign policy against China and North Korea and sometimes South Korea and Russia. Additionally, radical conservatives express anti-LGBT and anti-immigration sentiments, as well as engaging in denial of Japanese war crimes prior to and during World War II.

== History ==
During the Meiji era (1868–1912), Japan underwent a significant transformation as the country embarked on a process of rapid modernization and Westernization. While embracing modern reforms to strengthen Japan's economy and military, conservative factions within the government and society sought to preserve traditional Japanese values and institutions. The Meiji government implemented policies aimed at centralizing power under the Emperor, promoting nationalism, and reinforcing social hierarchies. These conservative efforts aimed to maintain social order amidst the profound societal changes brought about by industrialization and Western influence. Samurai values of loyalty, duty, and honor continued to influence conservative thought, emphasizing allegiance to the Emperor and the preservation of Japan's cultural identity in the face of Western encroachment.

In the 1930s and 1940s, conservatism took on a more extreme character. Influenced by rising militarism and expansionist ambitions, conservative factions within the government and military advocated for aggressive foreign policies aimed at securing Japan's dominance in East Asia. This period saw the emergence of ultranationalist parties such as the Imperial Rule Assistance Association and the militarization of Japanese society, with conservative forces pushing for military expansion and imperialist ventures in China and other parts of Asia. The rise of militarism and ultranationalism led to the erosion of democratic institutions and a tightening grip of authoritarianism, resulting in Japan's involvement in World War II.

After the war, Japanese conservatism experienced a resurgence under the leadership of the Liberal Democratic Party (LDP), which came to power in 1955 and established the "1955 system" of conservative dominance in Japanese politics. Due to this, the LDP emerged as a dominant political force which lasts to this day.

== Positions ==
Japanese conservatism espouses classical conservative stances and values in relation to the nuclear family, the nation-state, property rights, rule of law, and monarchy. As such, this section will only highlight policies that are exclusive to Japanese conservatism.

=== Domestic ===
Japanese conservatives advocate for revising the country's constitution, particularly Article 9, which renounces war and prohibits Japan from maintaining a military. Constitutional revision was the priority of many conservative prime ministers throughout the 20th and 21st century, notably during the second premiership of Shinzo Abe from 2012 to 2020.

Japanese conservatives and politicians often engage in denial of Japanese war crimes committed during the Imperial era (1868–1945), most notably its denial of the Nanjing and Kantō Massacres, making pseudohistorical claims that such events did not take place. Japanese conservatives occasionally engage in historical revisionism, glorifying aspects of Japan's wartime past, such as by visiting the Yasukuni Shrine, a Shinto shrine in Tokyo commemorating the 2,466,532 who died in service of Japan, including 1066 convicted war criminals. This has led to many controversies surrounding the shrine, as visits to the shrine by Japanese prime ministers, cabinet members, or parliamentarians draw condemnation from countries such as China and South Korea. Some Japanese conservatives have attempted to justify Japan's involvement in World War II by framing it as a noble cause to "liberate Asia from Western colonial powers".

Following the Fukushima nuclear accident in 2011, popular opinion towards nuclear energy has been contentious. While most Japanese conservatives advocate for the continued use and expansion of nuclear power, some moderates have called for phasing out nuclear energy entirely due to safety concerns and environmental risks.

Japan's practice of whaling has been a source of controversy both domestically and internationally. Most Japanese conservatives argue for the preservation of whaling as a cultural tradition and an important economic activity as opposed to Japanese liberals who mostly advocate for stricter regulations or an end to commercial whaling.

Japanese conservatives have often opposed changing the Imperial Household Law to allow for female succession to the Chrysanthemum Throne. Similarly, Japanese conservatives have opposed the country's surname reforms where married couples would be given the option of choosing either spouse's surname or creating a new surname altogether.

=== International ===
Japanese conservatives, with the exception of far-right ultranationalists, generally accept and embrace the country's close relations with the United States, supporting the U.S.–Japan Alliance and the presence of U.S. military forces in Japanese territory in contrast to Japanese progressives who opposes both the military alliance and the presence of American troops. Moreover, Japanese conservatives advocate for a stronger foreign policy against China (due to territorial disputes and geopolitical competition) and North Korea (due to its nuclear program and abductions of Japanese citizens), and sometimes towards South Korea (due to territorial disputes, comfort women issue, and trade disputes) and Russia (due to territorial disputes and Russia's invasion of Ukraine). Due to Japan's hostile relations with China, most Japanese conservatives support establishing closer relations with Taiwan, with prominent conservative politicians advocating for direct intervention if war between Taiwan and China were to break out.

Since the beginning of the Russian invasion of Ukraine in 2022, Japanese conservatives have expressed immense support for Ukraine due to Japan's ongoing territorial dispute with Russia regarding the Kuril Islands, which the Japanese government claims are "illegally occupied" by Russia. According to a 2012 Pew Global Attitudes Project survey, 72% of Japanese people view Russia unfavorably, making Japan the most anti-Russian country surveyed. A 2017 poll from the Japanese government found that 78.1% of Japanese said that they felt little or no affinity to Russia, which was the second highest percentage out of 8 regions polled (behind negative affinity to China at 78.5%).

== Conservative parties ==
=== Major parties ===
- Liberal Democratic Party (founded in 1955, ruling party: 1955–1993; 1994–2009; 2012–present)
- Komeito (founded in 1998, Junior coalition partner of the LDP: 1999–2009; 2012–2025)
- Japan Innovation Party (founded in 2015, junior coalition partner of the LDP, confidence and supply: 2025–present)
- Democratic Party For the People (founded in 2018)
- Sanseitō (founded in 2020)
- Conservative Party of Japan (founded in 2023)

=== Minor parties ===
- Greater Japan Patriotic Party (founded in 1951)
- Happiness Realization Party (founded in 2009)
- Collaborative Party (founded in 2013)
- Japan First Party (founded in 2016)
- Tomin First no Kai (founded in 2017)
- Tsubasa Party (founded in 2019)
- First no Kai (founded in 2021)

=== Others ===
- Nippon Kaigi (founded in 1997, non-governmental organization and lobbying group)

=== Defunct parties ===
==== Pre-war ====
- Rikken Seiyūkai (1900–1940)
- Constitutional Democratic Party (1927–1940)
- Imperial Rule Assistance Association (1940–1945, banned)
- Shōwakai (1935–1937)
- Tōhōkai (1936–1944)

==== Post-war ====
- Democratic Party (Japan, 1947) (1947–1950)
- Dōshi Club (1947–1948)
- Liberal Party (1950–1955, predecessor to the LDP)
- Japan Democratic Party (1954–1955, predecessor to the LDP)
- Democratic Socialist Party (1960–1994)
- Kōmeitō (1962–1998)
- New Liberal Club (1976–1986)
- Japan New Party (1992–1994)
- Japan Renewal Party (1993–1994)
- New Party Sakigake (1993–2004)
- New Frontier Party (1994–1997)
- Liberal Party (1998) (1998–2003)
- People's New Party (2005–2013)
- Your Party (2009–2014)
- Spirit of Japan Party (2010–2012)
- Sunrise Party (2010–2012)
- New Renaissance Party (2010–2017)
- Japan Restoration Party (2012–2014)
- Japan Innovation Party (2014–2016)
- Party for Japanese Kokoro (2014–2018)
- Kibō no Tō (2017–2021)

== Conservative media in Japan ==
- The Yomiuri Shimbun (Chūō Kōron)
- Fujisankei Communications Group (Sankei Shimbun, Fuji Television, Seiron)
- Bungei Shunjū (Shokun!)
- Japanese Culture Channel Sakura
- Shufu no Tomo
- Shūkan Shinchō

== Conservative figures ==
Prominent Japanese conservative figures include:

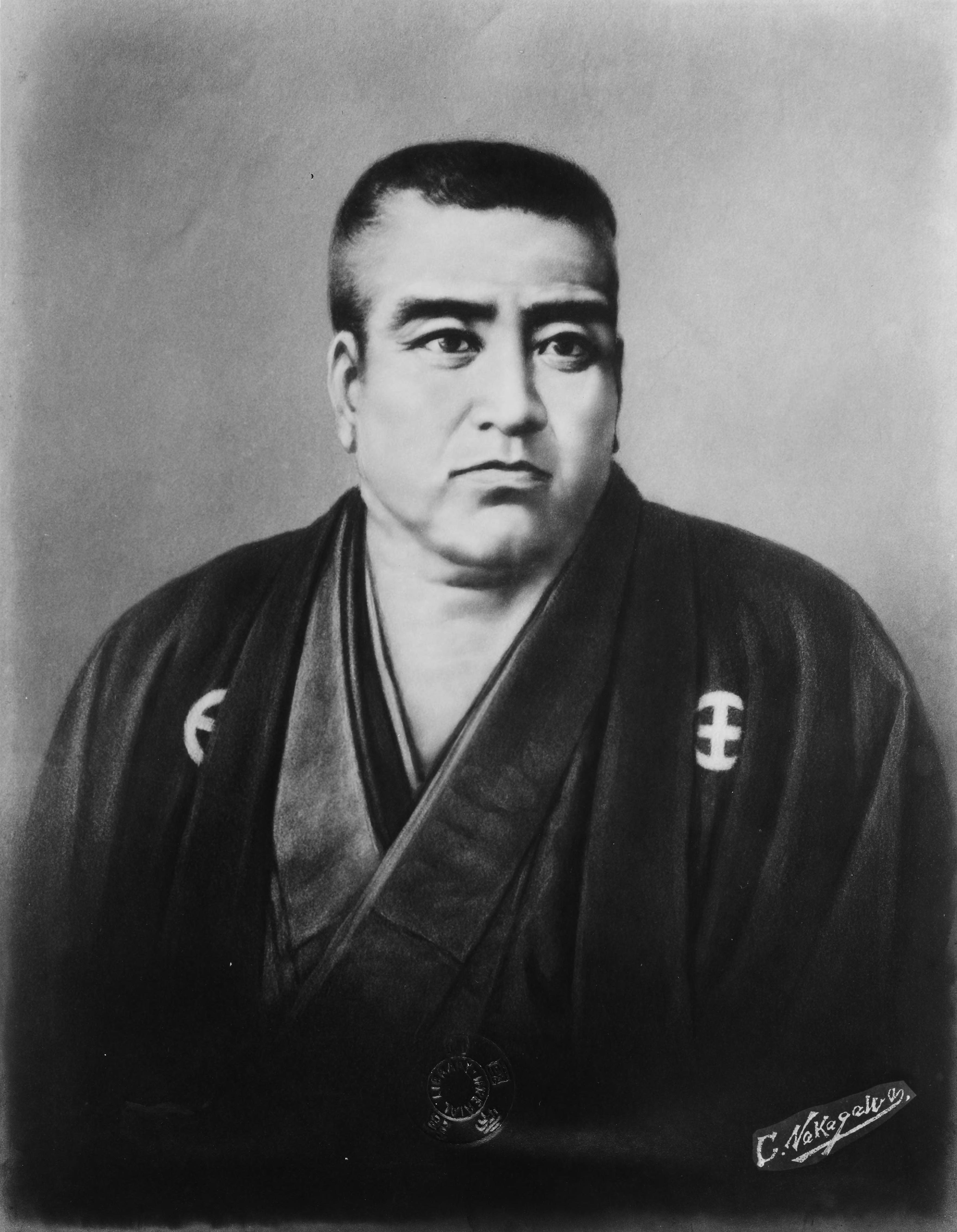
Saigō Takamori

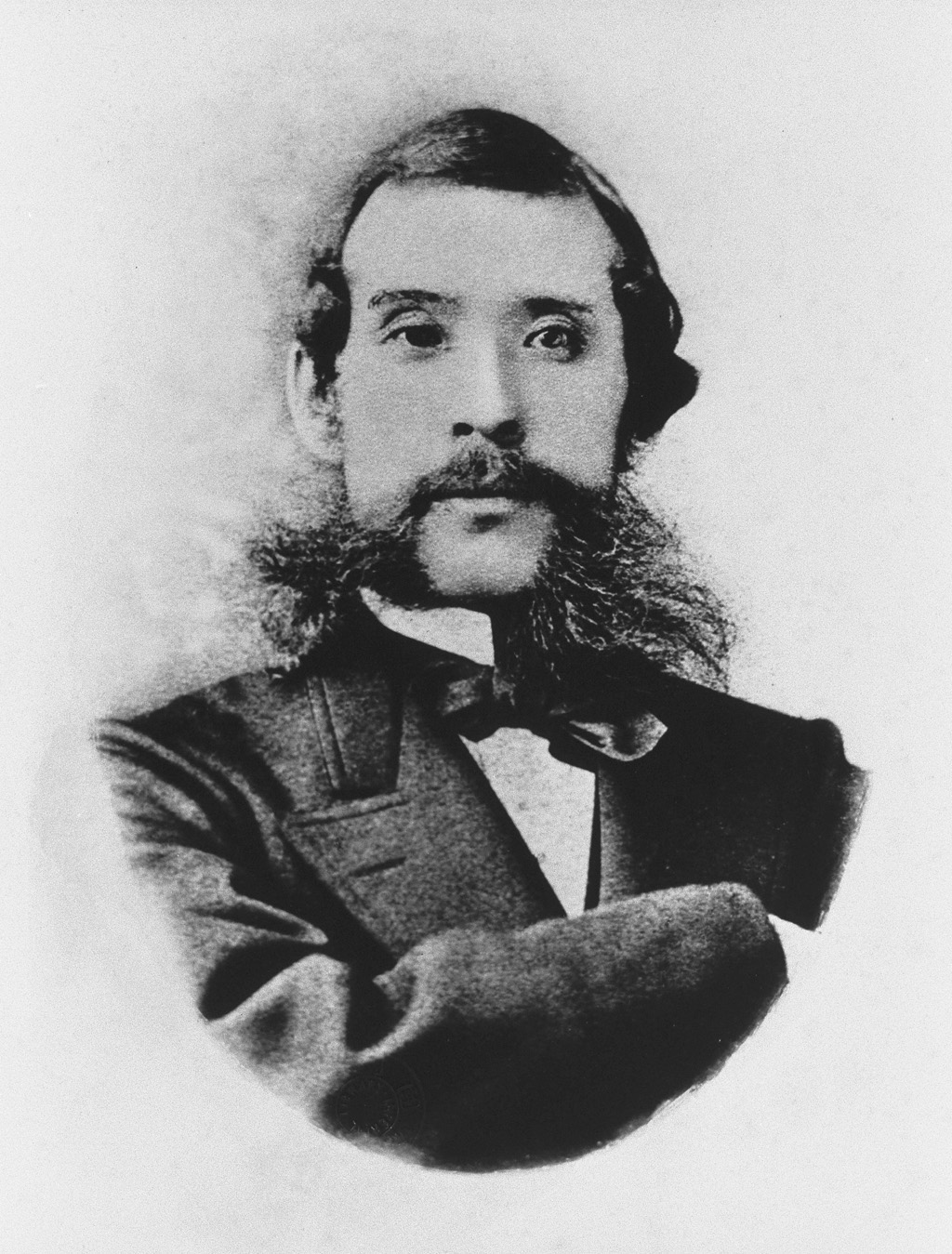
Home Minister Ōkubo Toshimichi

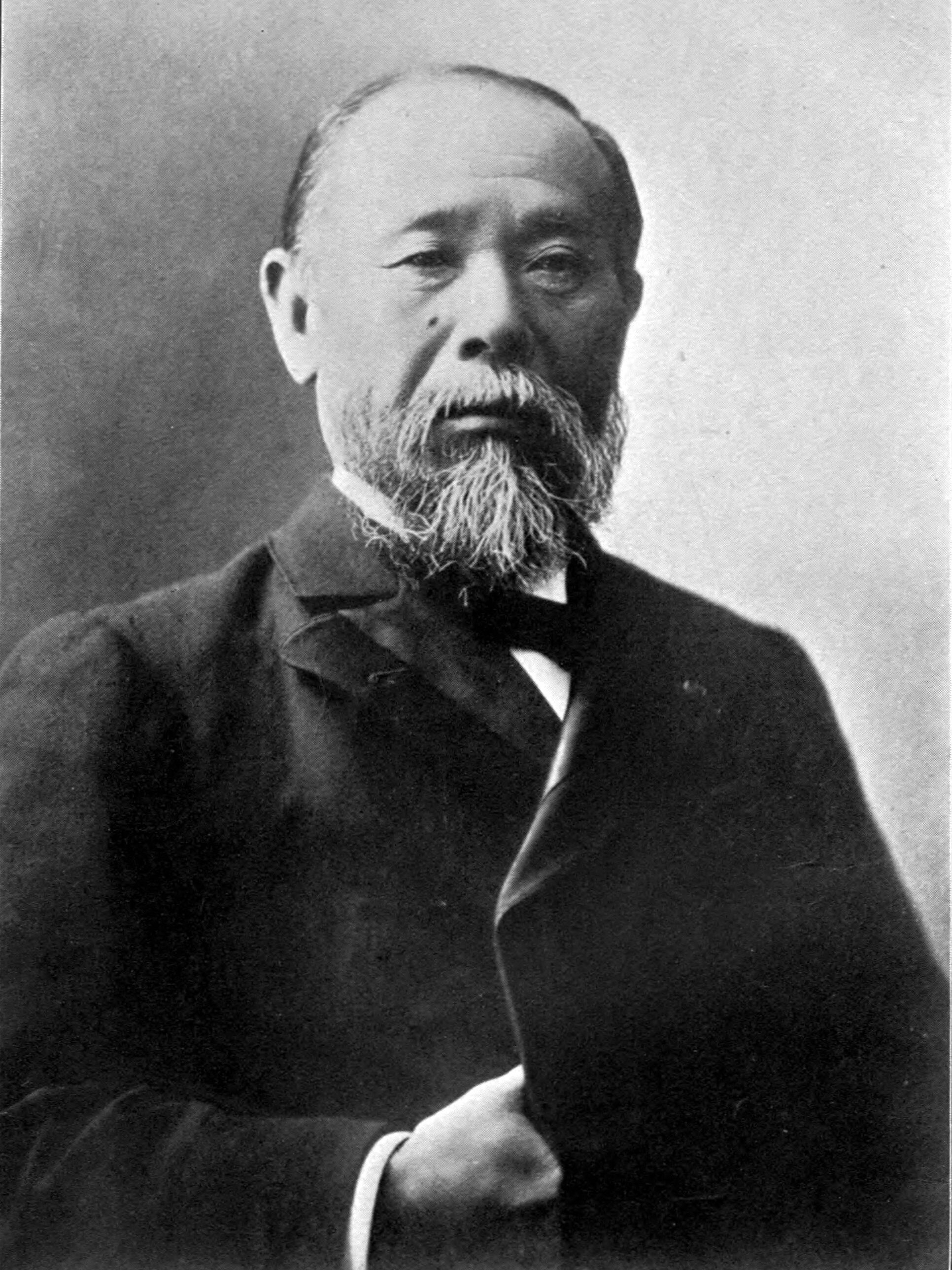
Prime minister Itō Hirobumi

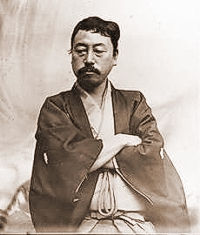
Okakura Kakuzō

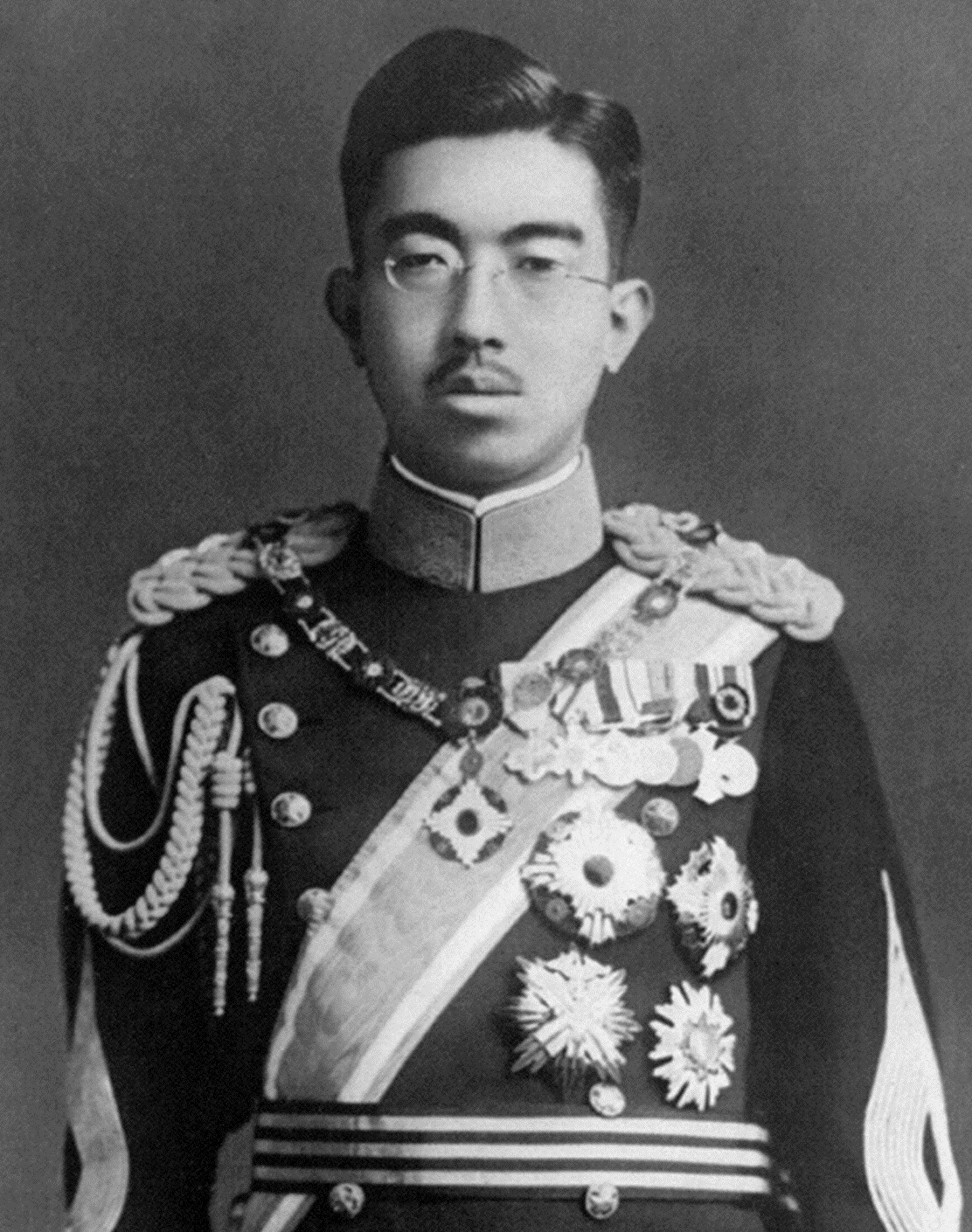
Emperor Shōwa

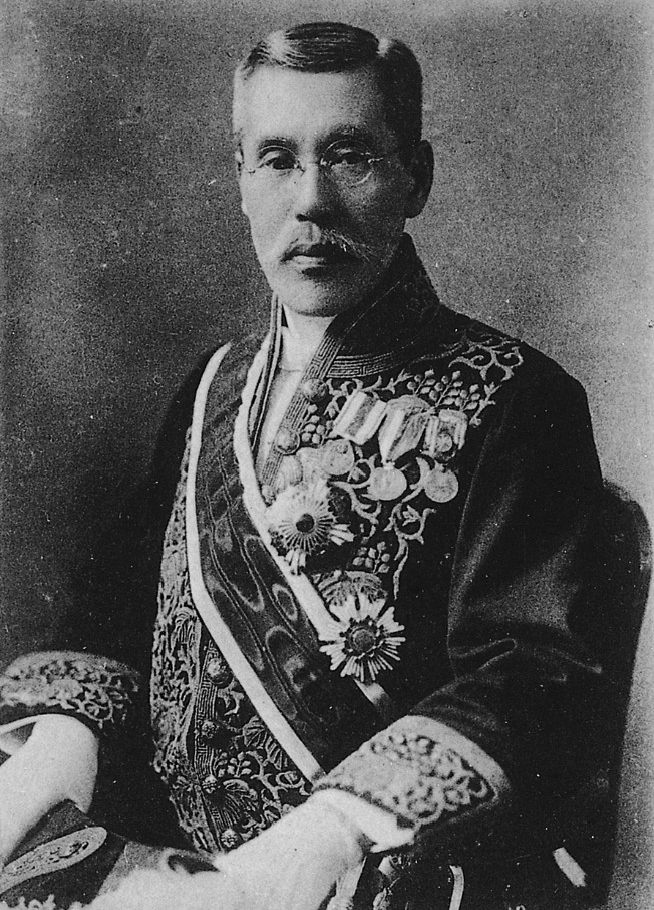
Prime minister Hiranuma Kiichirō

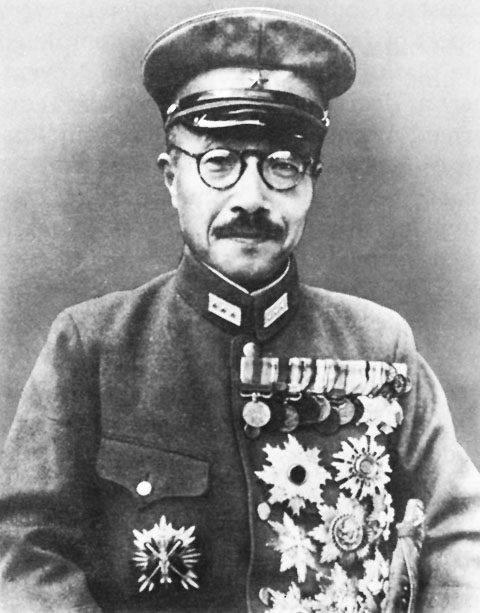
Prime minister Hideki Tojo

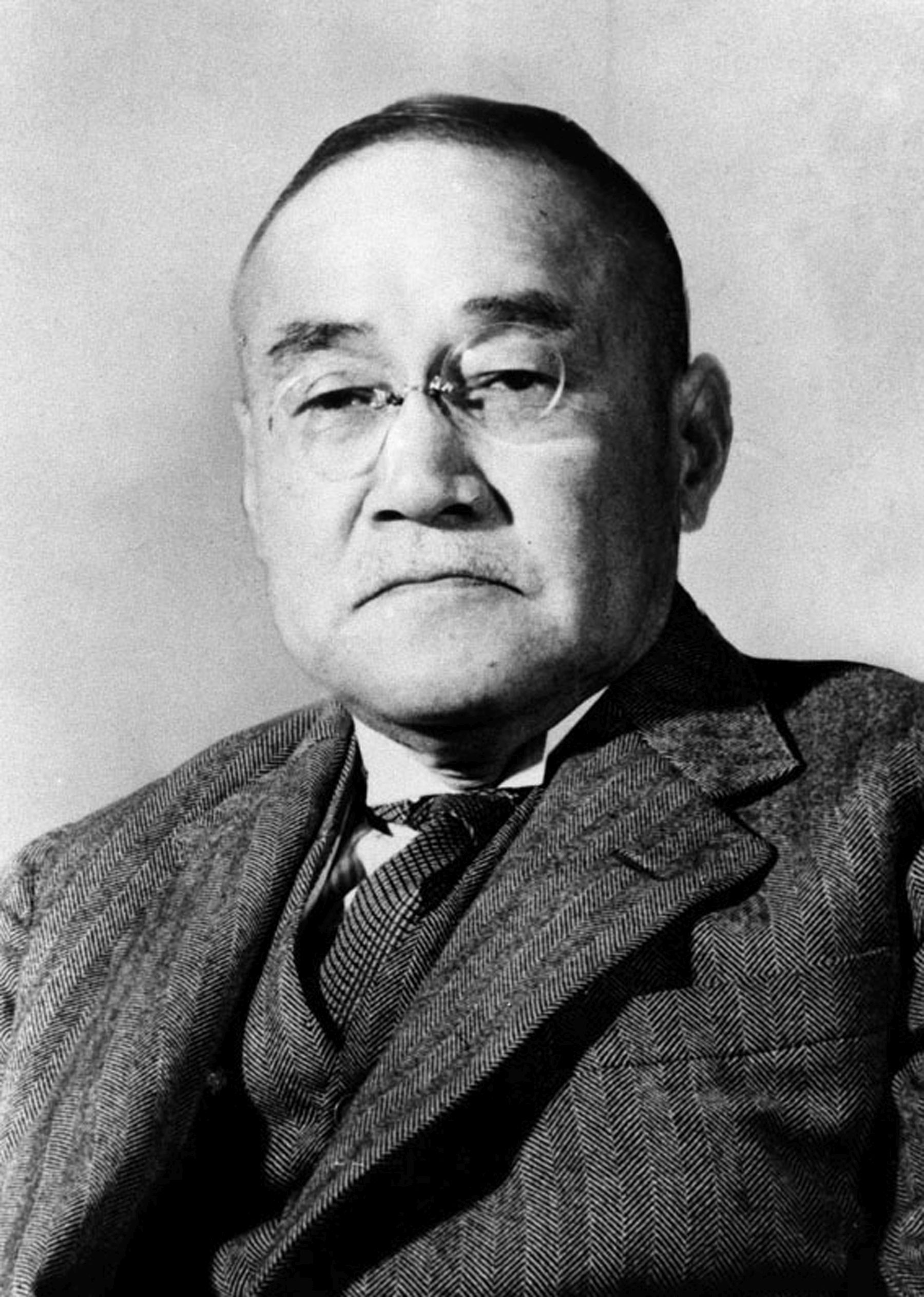
Prime minister Shigeru Yoshida

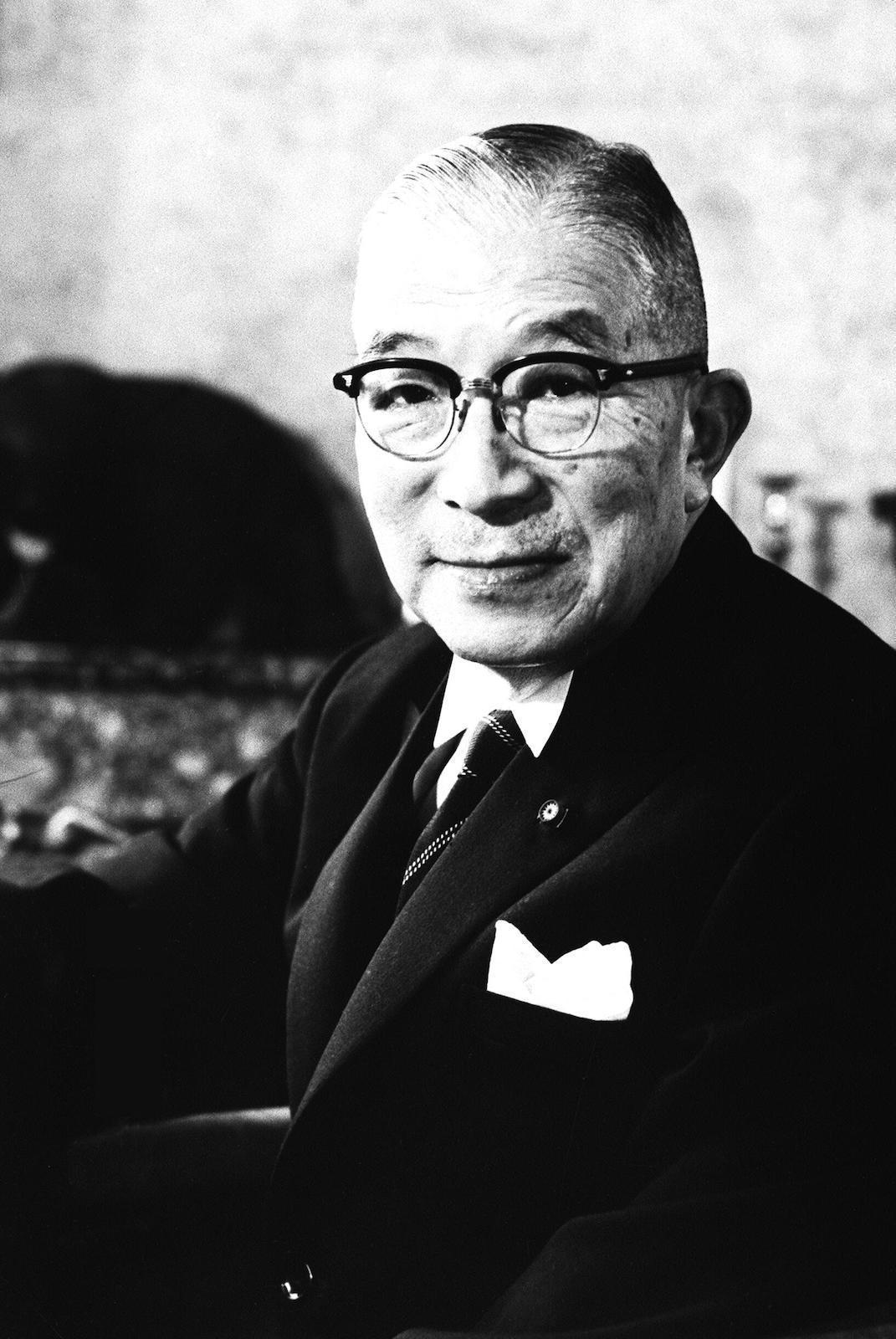
Prime minister Ichirō Hatoyama

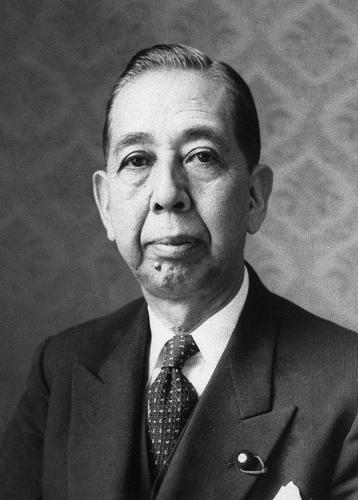
Prime minister Nobusuke Kishi

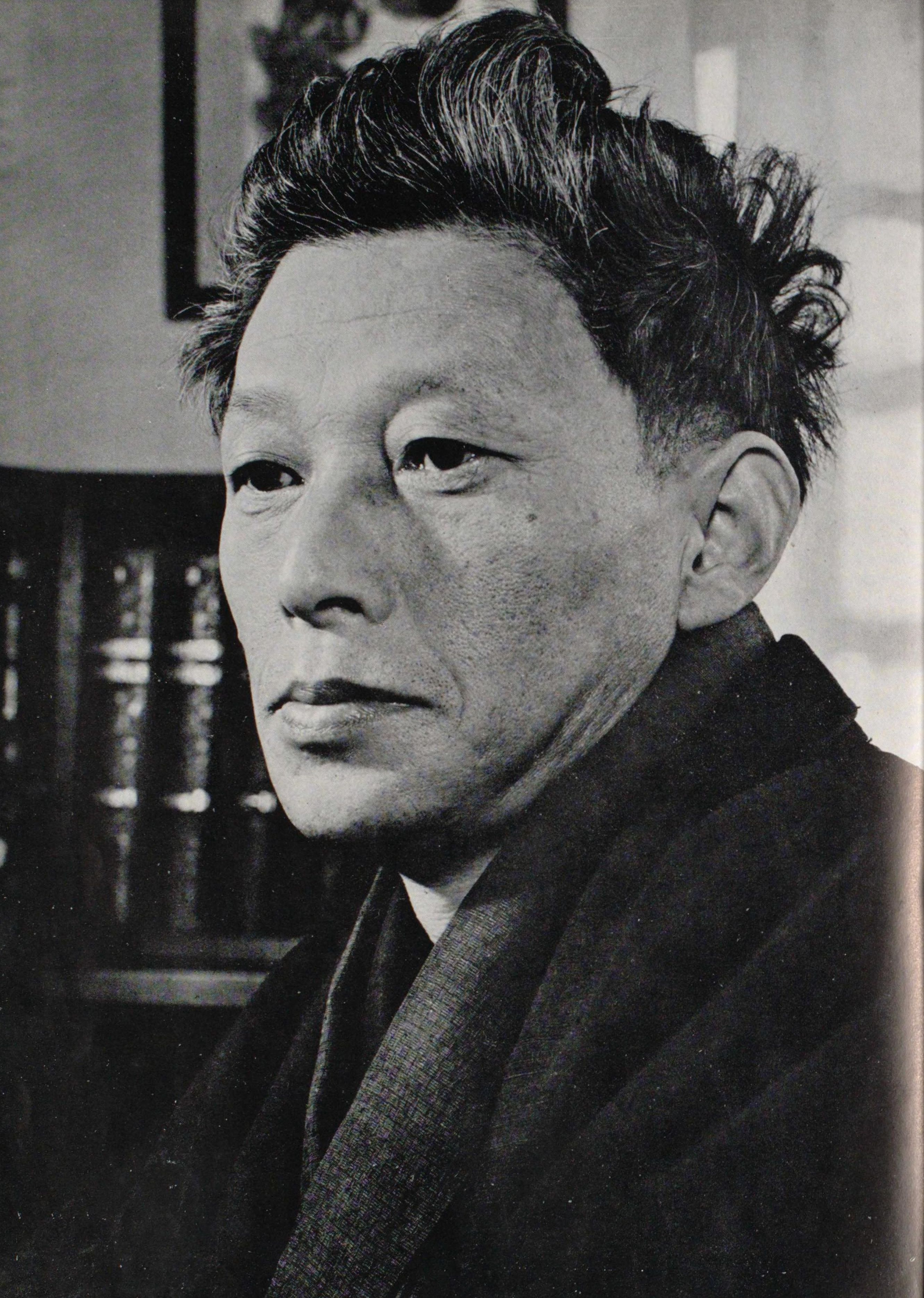
Hideo Kobayashi

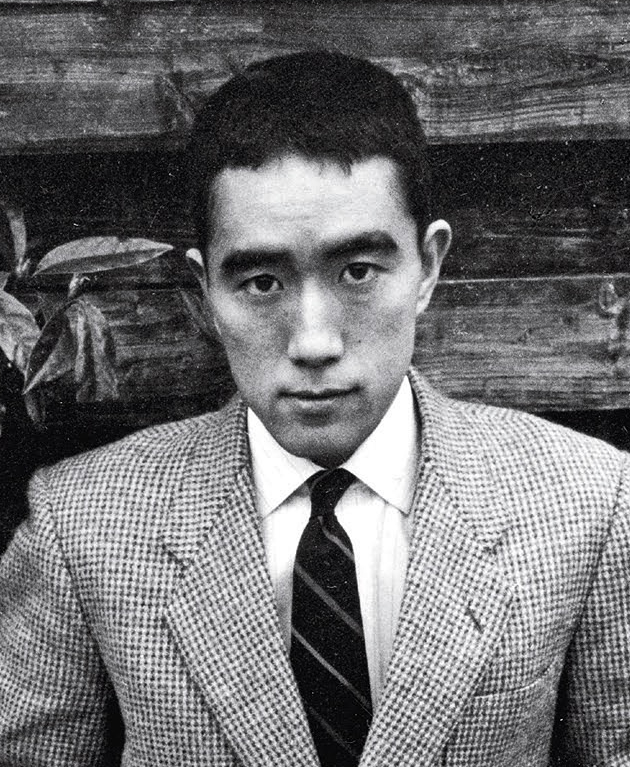
Yukio Mishima

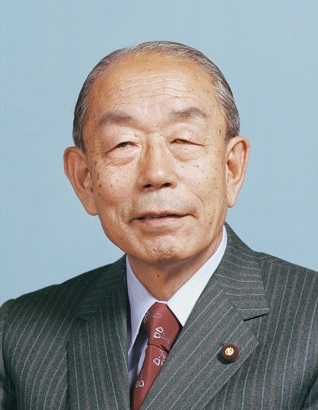
Prime minister Takeo Fukuda

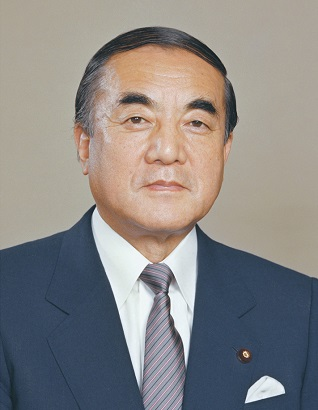
Prime minister Yasuhiro Nakasone

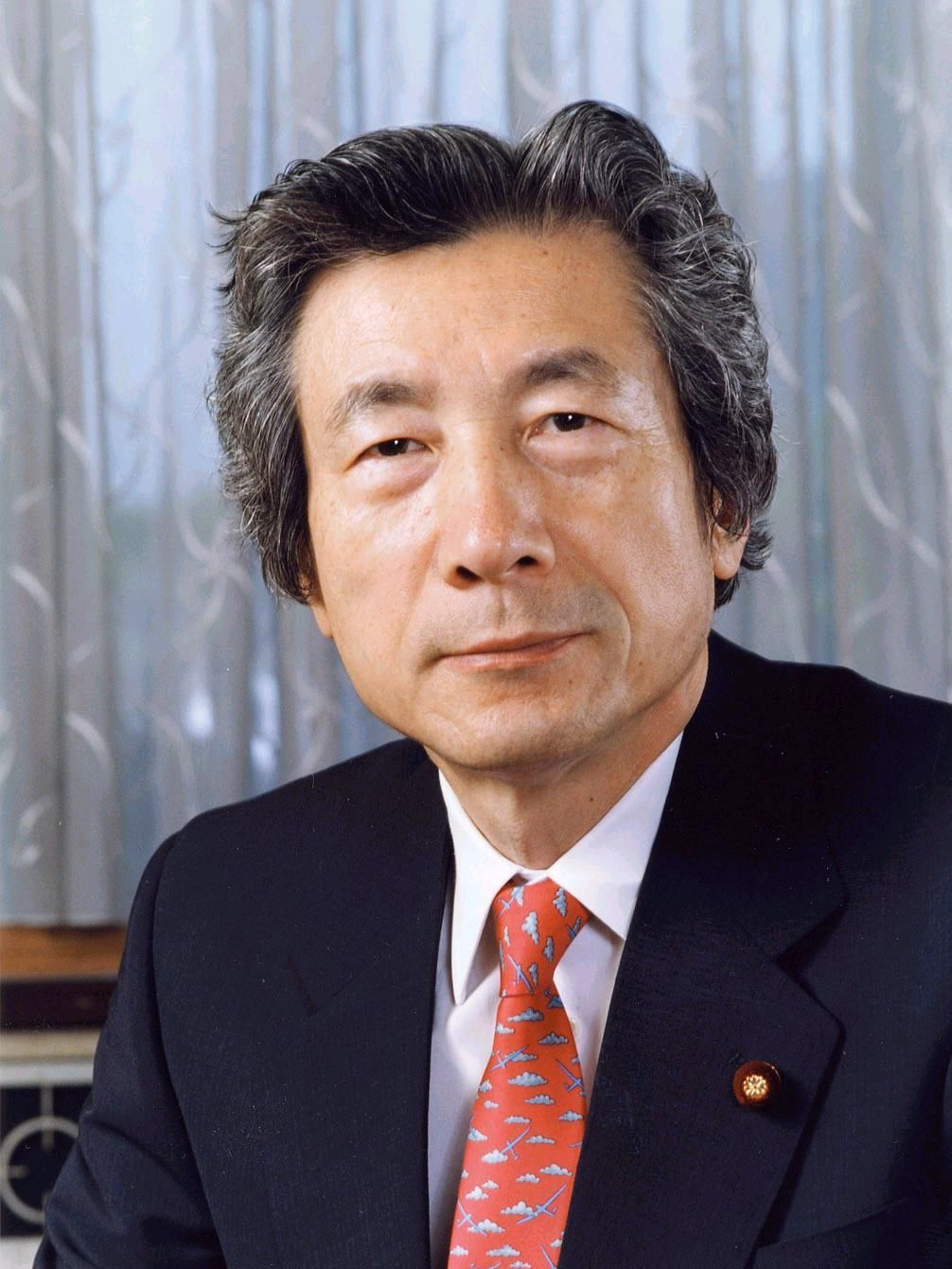
Prime minister Junichiro Koizumi

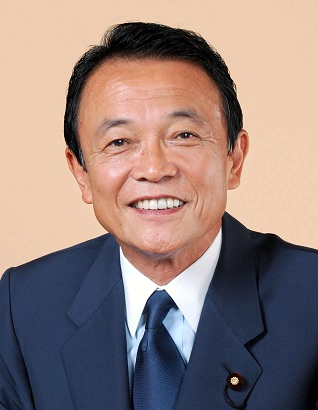
Prime minister Tarō Asō

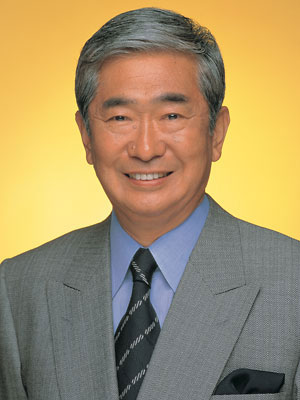
Governor Shintaro Ishihara of Tokyo

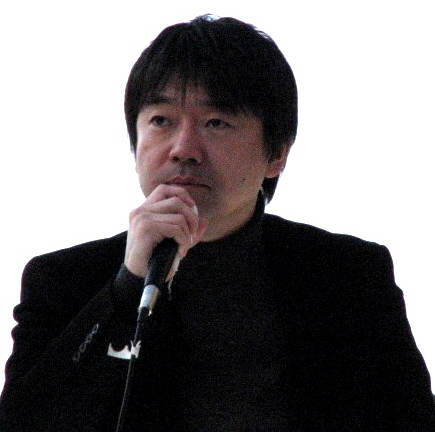
Governor Tōru Hashimoto of Osaka

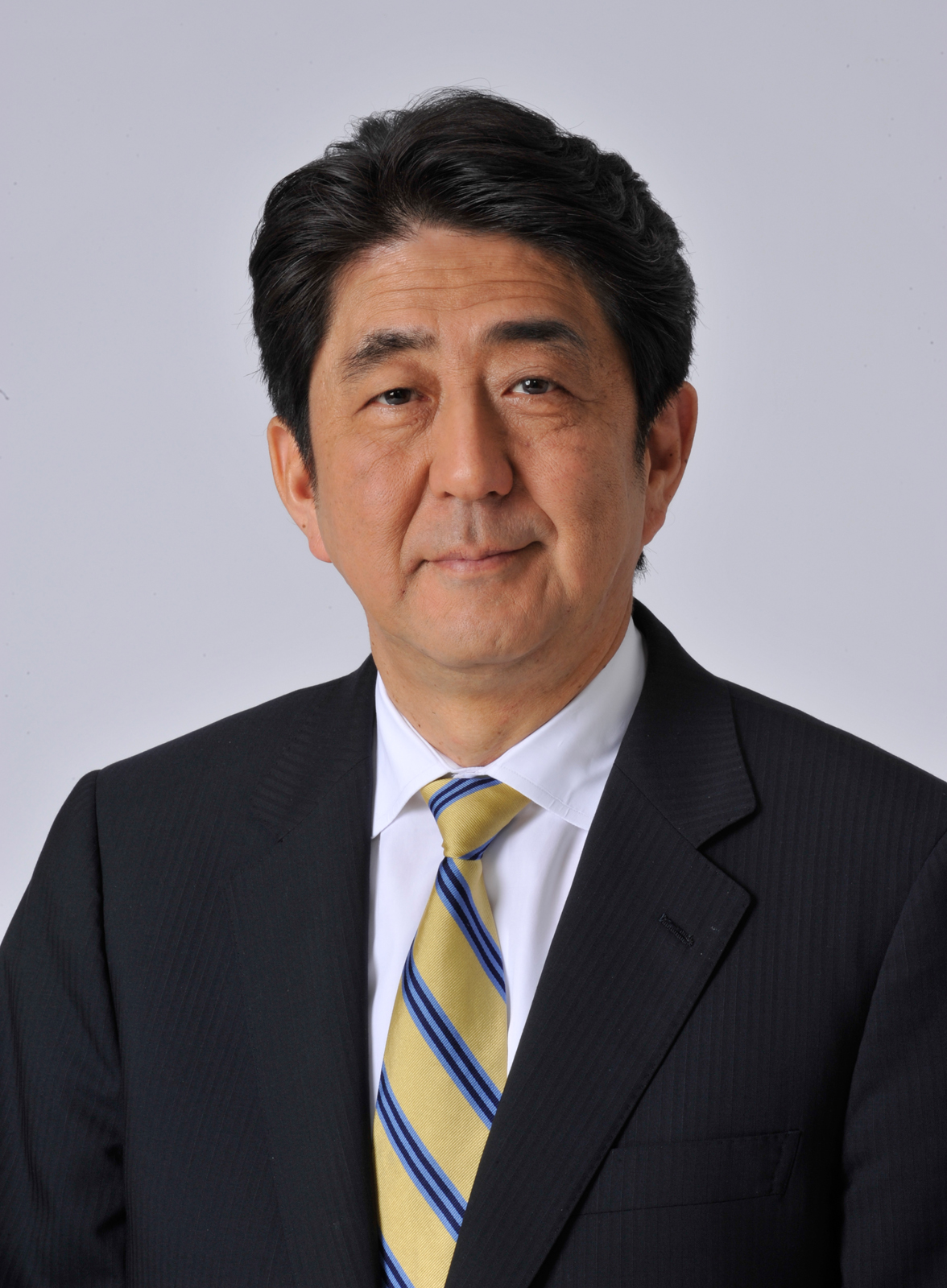
Prime Minister Shinzo Abe

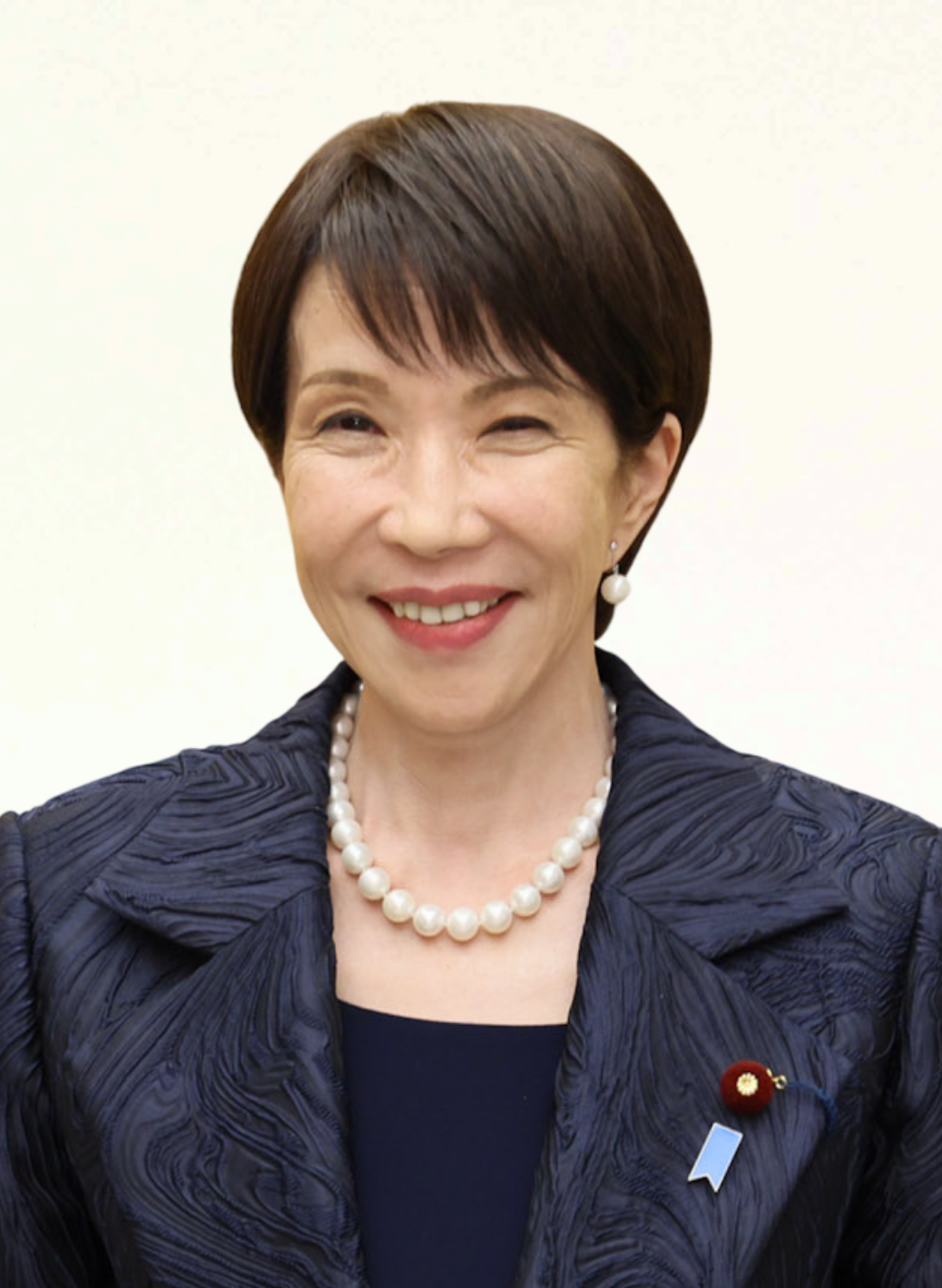
Prime Minister Sanae Takaichi

== See also ==
- Liberalism in Japan
- List of political parties in Japan
- Politics of Japan
