= Grit (grain) =

Bran and chaff of cereal grains

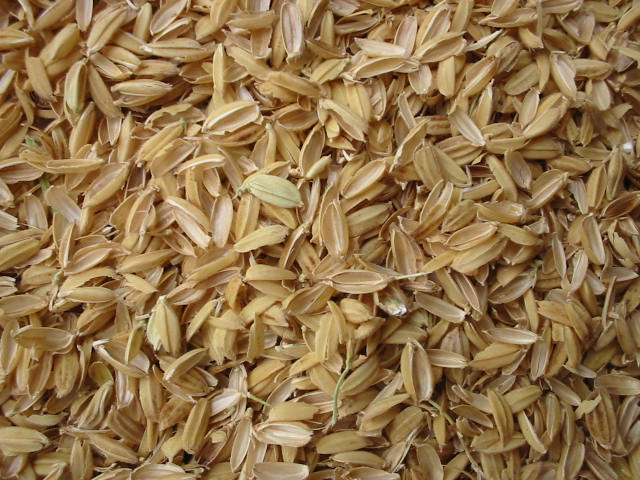
- Rice chaffs
- Type: Cereal

Grit (going back to Old English grytt or grytta or gryttes) is an almost extinct word for bran, chaff, or mill dust. It is also used for oats that have been husked but not ground, or that have been only coarsely ground—coarse oatmeal.

The word continues to be used for modern dishes like grits, an American maize-based food common in the Southern United States, consisting of coarsely ground corn; and the German red grits, Rote Grütze, a traditional pudding made of summer berries and starch and sugar. Grit here was the cheap supplier of starch. Gruels of grit, oatmeal grit preferably, were standard European nutrition of the lower classes in the Middle Ages and Early Modern Period.

== See also ==
- List of porridges
