= Rødgrød =

Danish/German dessert

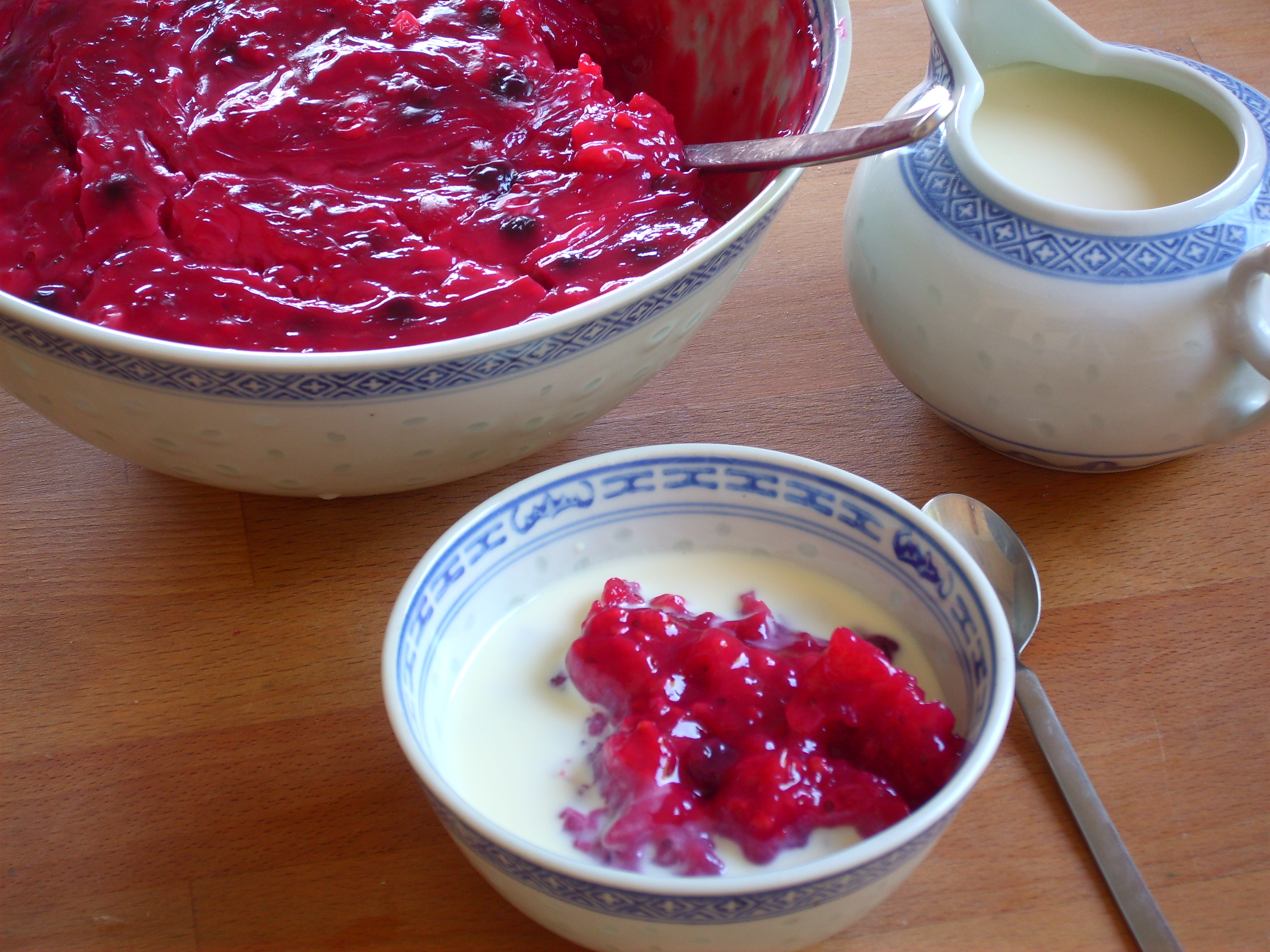
- Rødgrød with vanilla sauce
- Place of origin: Denmark and Germany
- Main ingredients: Potato starch, red summer berries, black cherries, sugar

Rødgrød (Danish: [ˈʁœðˀˌkʁœðˀ]), Rote Grütze (German: [ˈʁoːtə ˈɡʁʏtsə]), or Rode Grütt (Low German: [ˈroʊdə ˈɡrʏt]), meaning "red groats", is a sweet berry pudding from Denmark and Northern Germany. The name of the dish in Danish features many of the elements that make Danish pronunciation difficult for non-native speakers, so rødgrød med fløde, literally "red porridge with cream", has been a commonly used shibboleth since the early 1900s.

== Traditional preparation ==
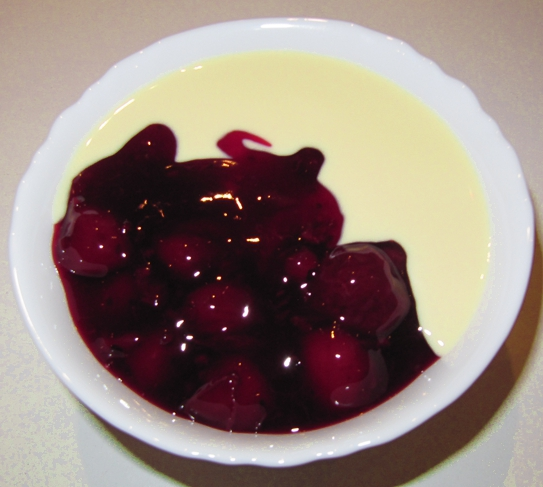
German rote Grütze ("Hamburg style" with vanilla sauce)

Rødgrød or rote Grütze was traditionally made of groat or grit, as revealed by the second component of the name in Danish, German, or Low German.

Semolina and sago are used in some family recipes; potato starch is today the standard choice to achieve a creamy to pudding-like starch gelatinization. The essential ingredients that justify the adjective are red summer berries such as redcurrant, blackcurrant, raspberries, strawberries, blackberries, bilberries and stoned black cherries. The essential flavour can be achieved with redcurrant alone; a small amount of blackcurrant will add variety; sugar is used to intensify the flavour. The amounts of starch, sago, semolina differ with the solidity desired; 20 to 60 grams on a kilogram or liter of the recipe are usual; sago, groats or grits have to soak before they can be used.

The preparation is basically that of a pudding: The fruits are cooked briefly with sugar. The mass should cool down for a moment so that the starch—dissolved in fruit juice or water—can be stirred into it without clumping. A second cooking process of one to two minutes is needed to start the gelatinization; remaining streaks of white starch have to clear up in this process.

Rødgrød or rote Grütze is served hot or cold as a dessert with milk, a mixture of milk and vanilla sugar, vanilla sauce, (whipped) cream, vanilla ice cream, or custard to balance the refreshing taste of the fruit acids.

== Variants ==
There are several commercial variants of rødgrød, sold in German supermarkets. Grüne Grütze, a green variant, is made from apple, gooseberries, kiwifruit and rhubarb by a Danish producer. This unusual combination may be inspired by the more traditional Danish dish of stikkelsbærgrød (gooseberry jelly). In blaue Grütze, the blue variant, blackberries, bilberries, plums, blackcurrants and grapes are usually used. Gelbe Grütze consists of peaches, yellow gooseberries, bananas, gold kiwifruit or other yellow fruits.

In Poland, parts of Russia, the Baltic states, Finland, and Ukraine, kissel is known as a dessert similar to rødgrød.

In the US Virgin Islands, which were formerly the Danish West Indies before the US purchased them in 1917, the dish is known as red grout, is typically served with a custard sauce and is made with tapioca, guava and sugar.

In Southern Brazil, sagu is a popular dessert made with tapioca pearls, sugar and red wine, mainly appreciated by Italian and German-origin families.

== See also ==
- Danish cuisine
- Fruit kissel
- List of fruit dishes
- List of porridges
- List of shibboleths
