= Anti-Chinese sentiment in Japan =

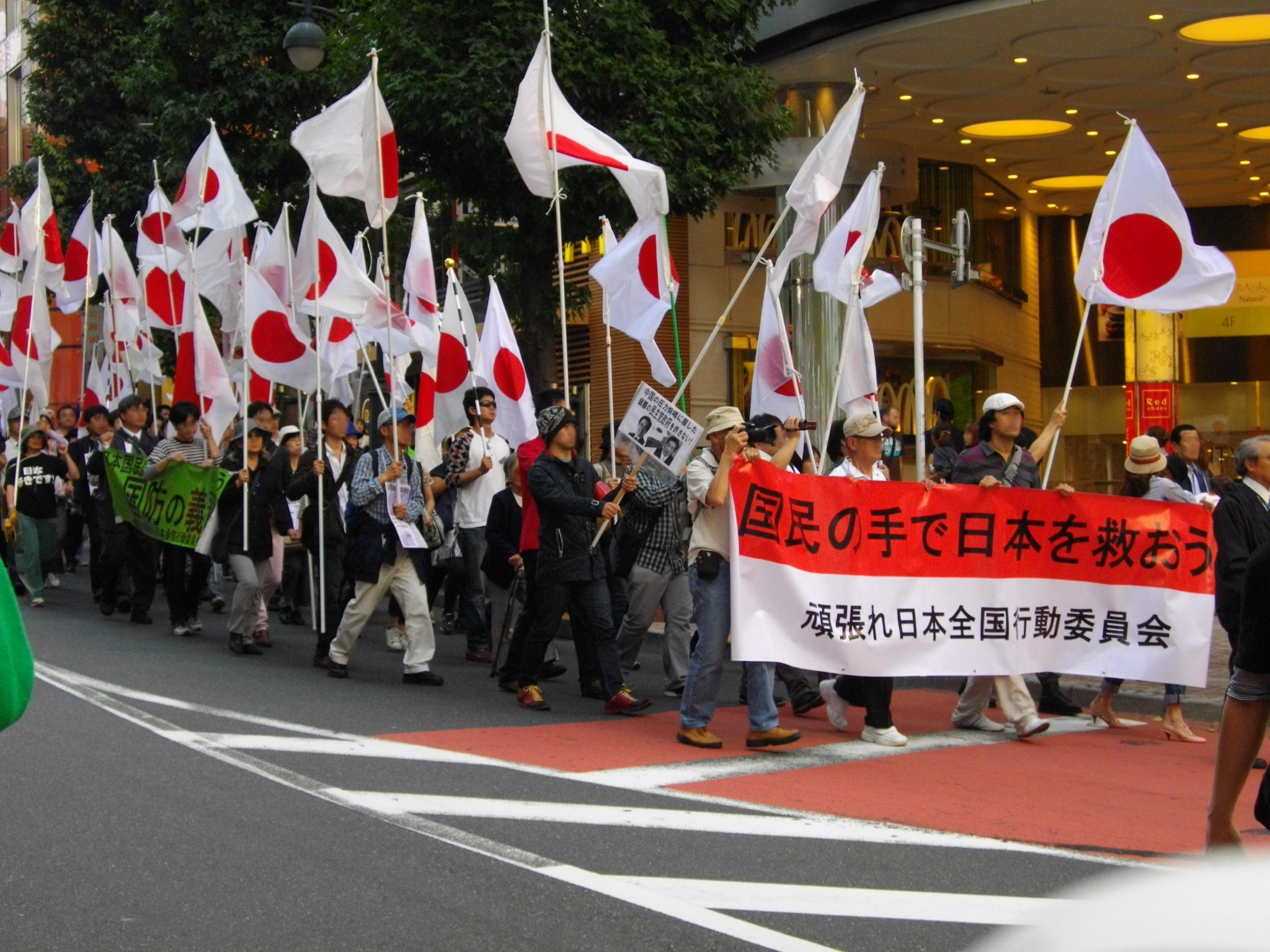
2010 Japanese anti-Chinese protest in Shibuya, Tokyo, concerning Chinese claim of sovereignty over the Senkaku Islands.

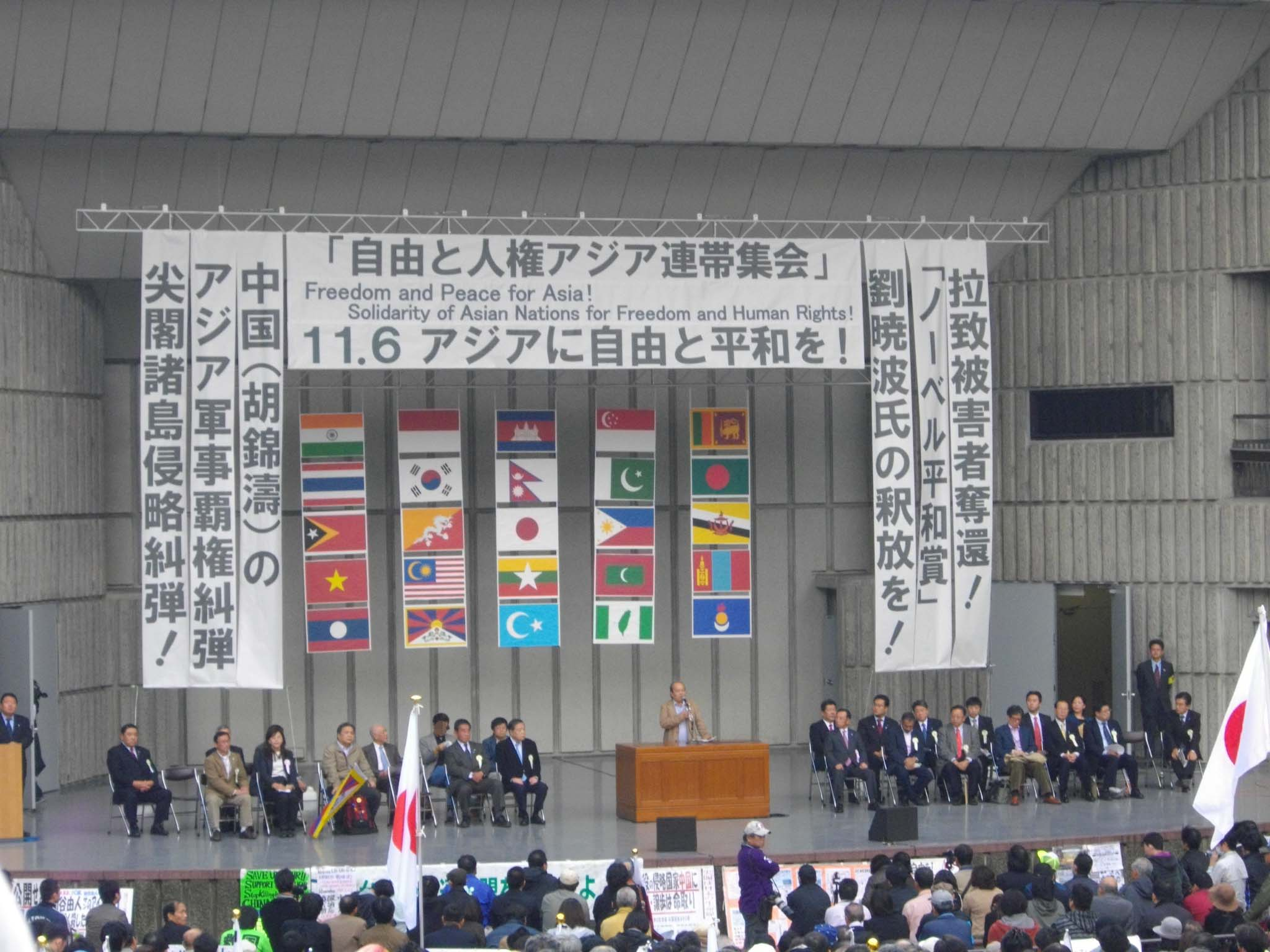
Anti-Chinese rally in Hibiya in 2010

Anti-Chinese sentiment has been present in Japan since ancient times. While Japan was historically influenced by China with its writing system, architecture, and religion, negative sentiment of China has persisted to modern times, due to nationalistic and historical disputes.

== History ==
=== Tokugawa period ===
Beginning in the Tokugawa period (1600 to 1868), Japan left a prolonged period of civil war and began to prosper as a unified and stable state. This period saw an attempt to remove foreign influences on Japanese culture, including the influence of Chinese culture. During this time, Japan maintained a policy of self-isolation, leading to the further development of its culture with little foreign influence. A rise in national self-respect at this time resulted in Japan viewing itself as the centre of a "civilised world surrounded by barbarians."

A key proponent of these movements and schools of thought was the cultural movement and branch of scholarship known as kokugaku (国学), translating literally as "national studies", and translated commonly as "Japanese studies". Kokugaku aimed through its practitioners (known as kokugakushu) to distinguish between a perception of genuine Japanese culture in contrast to what was considered as foreign culture, with the resulting goal being to revert Japanese culture to one devoid of foreign influence.

Practitioners of kokugaku placed particular importance on Shinto, Japan's indigenous religion, seen as a bulwark against foreign, and especially Confucian and Buddhist, influences. However, by the time kokugaku developed, Shinto had already been heavily influenced by both Confucianism and Buddhism; due to this, the net effect of kokugaku scholarship and its achievements is debated.

=== Empire of Japan ===
Following the Meiji Restoration and the abandonment of its self isolationist policy, Japan pursued a policy of aggressive Westernisation and industrialisation in effort to match the progress of Western nations. At the same time as this, China had begun to sink into a state of deep dysfunction, and was perceived as a declining power by many, including Japan.

After the Qing dynasty lost the First Sino-Japanese War, Chinese officials and generals were depicted in illustrations as slant-eyed and incompetent, while Japanese soldiers were portrayed as tall and more European.

The World War II also compounded on this, resulting in the loss of life of more than 20 million mostly civilian Chinese people. The property loss suffered by the Chinese was valued at US$383 billion at the currency exchange rate in July 1937, roughly 50 times the GDP of Japan at that time (US$7.7 billion).

=== Post World War II ===
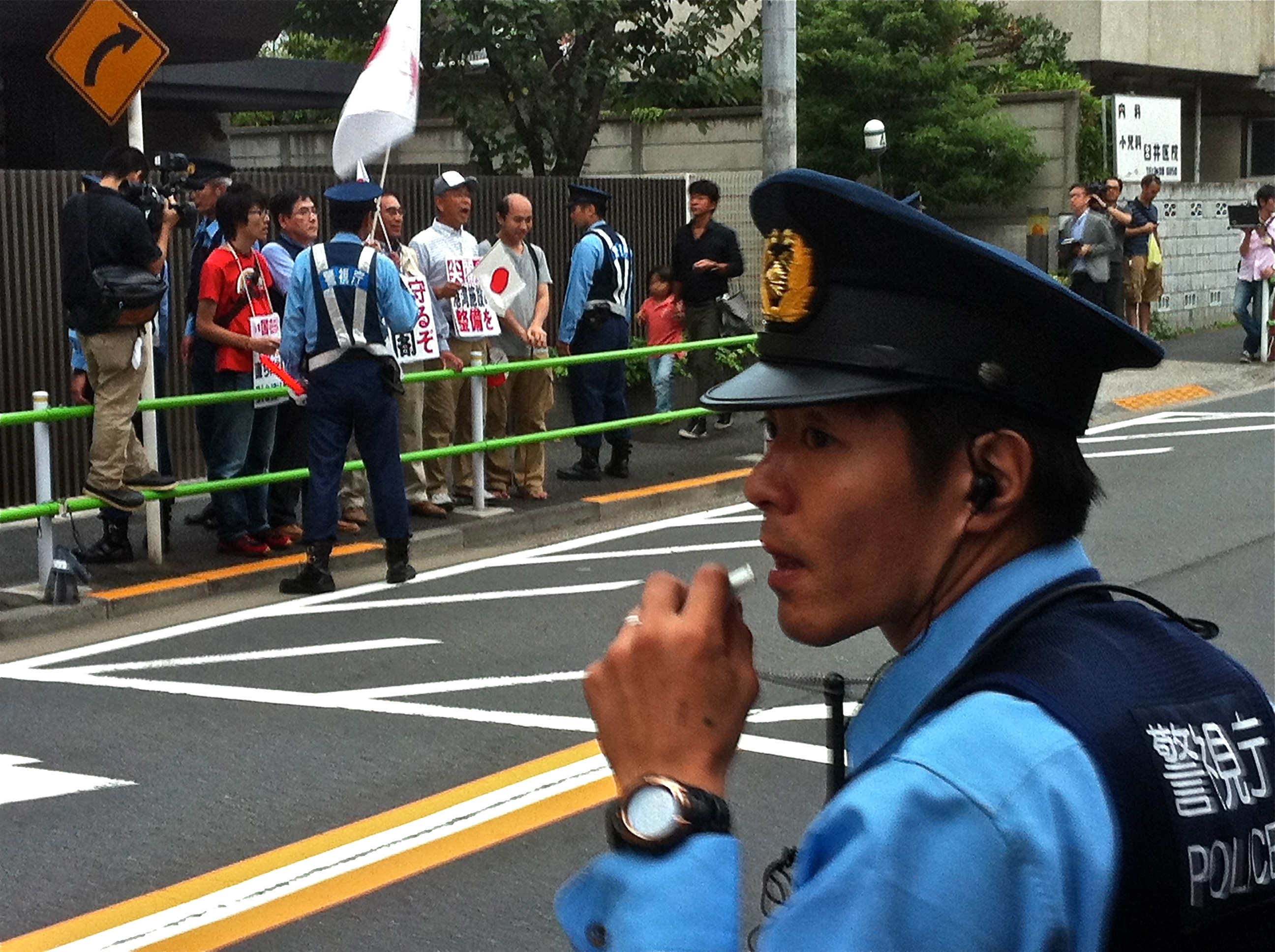
Police officers monitor anti-Chinese protests in front of the Chinese Embassy in Tokyo, Japan, during the 2012 Senkaku Islands dispute.

Following the end of the World War II, openly Sinophobic sentiments were stifled and became taboo in mainstream Japanese media, despite the opposing positions taken by Japan and the People's Republic of China in the Cold War. Use of the formerly common word Shina (支那) (lit., "China") has all but disappeared except in a handful of cases, such as the Japanese name for "South China Sea" and an alternative term for ramen.

Following the Cold War, there was little contact between Japan and the People's Republic of China, and little discussion of China until the relationship between the countries was normalised in 1972, following a surge of interest within Japan about its neighbour. China renounced reparations for the Second World War, partly to avoid appearing less generous than Taiwan — which had earlier done the same — and to strengthen its position against the Soviet Union. The response was of considerable gratitude and goodwill in Japan, with Sinophobia confined to anti-communism. Public animosity toward the People's Republic of China was minimal compared to the public animosity held against the Soviet Union, and a friendly mood prevailed. Improvements were also seen in social attitudes toward ethnic Chinese residents of Japan, along with other minorities such as Zainichi Koreans and the Ainu people.

However, since 2000, Japan has seen a gradual resurgence of anti-Chinese sentiments, coupled with the effects of an increasingly tense political relationship between Japan and the People's Republic of China. The reason partly stems from the Japanese history textbook controversies and official visits to the Yasukuni Shrine, as well as Chinese use of anti-Japan sentiment to buttress their own domestic politics. The anti-Japanese riots of 2005 are cited as raising tensions within China and fear of China within the Japanese public. Many Japanese nationalist groups, such as Ganbare Nippon and Zaitokukai, are anti-Chinese, with data from the Pew Global Attitude Project (2008) showing that 85% of Japanese people surveyed held unfavourable views of China, and that 73% held unfavourable views of Chinese people.

Surveys conducted by the Pew Research Center show that 88% of respondents in Japan held an unfavorable view of China in 2021 compared to a historical peak of 93% in 2013. According to a Genron NPO poll in 2024, 89% of Japanese people have a negative view of China. A survey published in 2025 by the Pew Research Center found that 86% of Japanese people had an unfavorable view of China, while 13% had a favorable view, the most negative of any nation surveyed.

The Economist has written that according to a survey done in 2021, more than 40% of Japanese aged 18–29 feel an "affinity" towards China, compared to only 13% for those aged in their 60s and 70s.

== See also ==
- China–Japan relations
- History of China–Japan relations
- Anti-Chinese sentiment in the United States
- Anti-Korean sentiment in Japan
- Anti-Japanese sentiment in China
- Nativism (politics)
