= List of shibboleths =

Below are listed various examples of words and phrases that have been identified as shibboleths, a word or custom whose variations in pronunciation or style can be used to differentiate members of ingroups from those of outgroups.

== Original shibboleth ==
The term originates from the Hebrew word shibbólet (שִׁבֹּלֶת), which means the part of a plant containing grain, such as the head of a stalk of wheat or rye; or less commonly (but arguably more appropriately) (Note: The context was the crossing of the River Jordan; according to Speiser 1942, p. 10 the medieval Hebrew commentators and most modern scholars have understood it in this alternative sense.) "flood, torrent".

The modern use derives from an account in the Hebrew Bible, in which pronunciation of this word was used to distinguish Ephraimites, whose dialect used a differently sounding first consonant. The difference concerns the Hebrew letter shin, which is now pronounced as [ʃ] (as in shoe). In the Book of Judges, chapter 12, after the inhabitants of Gilead under the command of Jephthah inflicted a military defeat upon the invading tribe of Ephraim (around 1370–1070 BC), the surviving Ephraimites tried to cross the River Jordan back into their home territory, but the Gileadites secured the river's fords to stop them. To identify and kill these Ephraimites, the Gileadites told each suspected survivor to say the word shibboleth. The Ephraimite dialect resulted in a pronunciation that, to Gileadites, sounded like sibboleth. In Judges 12:5–6 in the King James Bible, the anecdote appears thus (with the word already in its current English spelling):

And the Gileadites took the passages of Jordan before the Ephraimites: and it was so, that when those Ephraimites which were escaped said, Let me go over; that the men of Gilead said unto him, Art thou an Ephraimite? If he said, Nay; Then said they unto him, Say now Shibboleth: and he said Sibboleth: for he could not frame to pronounce it right. Then they took him, and slew him at the passages of Jordan: and there fell at that time of the Ephraimites forty and two thousand.

— Judges 12:5–6

== Shibboleths used in war and persecution ==
=== Dutch–French ===
- Schild en vriend: On 18 May 1302, the people of Bruges killed the French occupiers of the city during a nocturnal surprise attack. According to a famous legend, they stormed into the houses where they knew the tenants were forced to board and lodge French troops serving as city guards, roused every male person from his bed and forced him to repeat the challenge schild en vriend (shield and friend). The Flemings pronounced schild with a separate "s" /s/ and "ch" /x/". Flemings would pronounce vriend with a voiced v whereas French would render those as a voiceless f.

Every Frenchman who failed the test was stabbed on the spot, still in his nightgown. Because the signal for the uprising was the matins bells of the city's churches and monasteries, this became known as the Bruges Matins or Brugse Metten. Like the name of the massacre, the story may have been influenced by the Sicilian uprising mentioned below.

The problem with this legend is that in Medieval manuscripts of that time, a shield is referred to as "skilde" as in Norse and Norse-influenced English words. Therefore, it is sometimes said that the words must have been "'s gilden vriend" meaning "friend of the guilds." The combination of the 's and the g in "'s gilden" would be pronounced /sx/.

=== Italian/Sicilian–French ===
- Ciciri (chickpeas): This was used by native Sicilians to ferret out Angevin French soldiers in the late 13th century during the Sicilian Vespers, the uprising which freed the island from Angevin rule. Both the Italian soft c /tʃ/, and the Italian r, were (and are still) difficult for the French to pronounce as that sequence of sounds seldom appears in French; also, in French and Angevin, words are primarily stressed on the final syllable.

=== Sardinian-Italian ===
- During Sardinian Vespers, on 28 April 1794, known as sa dii de s'aciappa ("the day of the pursuit and capture"), people in Cagliari started chasing any Piedmontese functionaries they could find; since many of them started to wear the local robes in order to blend into the crowd, any people suspected to be from the Italian mainland would be asked by the populace to "say chickpea" (nara cixiri) in Sardinian: failure in pronouncing the word correctly would give their origin away.

=== Frisian–Dutch ===
Bûter, brea, en griene tsiis; wa't dat net sizze kin, is gjin oprjochte Fries

- Bûter, brea, en griene tsiis; wa't dat net sizze kin, is gjin oprjochte Fries (example) (meaning "Butter, rye bread and green cheese, whoever cannot say that is not a genuine Frisian") was used by the Frisian Pier Gerlofs Donia during a Frisian rebellion (1515–1523). Ships whose crew could not pronounce this properly were usually plundered and soldiers who could not were beheaded by Donia himself.

=== Castilian Spanish–Latin-American Spanish ===
- During the Latin American wars of independence, the name Francisco was used by Colombian rebels to tell locals from Spaniards. Whoever pronounced it as /fɾanˈθisko/ (as in European Spanish) as opposed to /fɾanˈsisko/ would have been thrown into the Magdalena River.

=== English–Dutch ===
- In the Peasants' Revolt of 1381, many Flemings "loste hir heedes at that tyme and namely they that koude nat say Breede and Chese, but Case and Brode."

=== Finnish–Russian ===
- Yksi: Finnish for "one", used by the White Guard to separate Russians from Finns in the Finnish Civil War during the invasion of Tampere. Many of the Russians caught had changed to civilian clothing, so suspected people were rounded up, even from hospitals, and asked to say yksi [ˈyksi] (or made to count to ten in Finnish). If the prisoner pronounced it [ˈjuksi], mistaking the front vowel 'y' for an iotated 'u' (ю), he was considered a Russian foreign fighter and was shot on the spot. Any Slav or Balt, Communist or not, was killed, including some members of the White Guard.
- Höyryjyrä: Finnish for "steamroller", used by the Finnish Army in the Second World War. This word is almost impossible to pronounce for anyone not skilled in Finnish, with the frontal 'ö' and 'y' and rolled 'r' [ˈhøy̯ryˌjyræ]. For Russian speakers, the leading 'h' is also difficult.

=== Spanish–French and Haitian Creole ===
- Dominican dictator Rafael Trujillo conducted a massacre of undocumented Haitian settlers along the Dominican–Haitian border. The action is known as the Parsley Massacre. Suspects not fluent in Spanish either did not know or could not properly pronounce the Spanish word perejil ("parsley"). The pronunciation of the word by Haitian citizens tended to be with a trilled r, unlike the native Spanish tapped r, and without the 'l' at the end of the word.

=== Azeri–Armenian ===
- During the Sumgait Pogrom, Azerbaijani rioters targeted ethnic Armenians pulled from their homes and vehicles by asking them the Azerbaijani word for hazelnut, fundukh (Azerbaijani: fındıq), which Armenians typically pronounce with a [p] instead of an [f].

=== Polish–German ===
- Soczewica, koło, miele, młyn (Old Polish pronunciation: [ˈs̪ɔt͡ʃɛvit͡sʲa ˈkɔɫɔ ˈmʲɛlʲɛ ˈmɫɪn̪]), meaning "lentil, wheel, grinds [verb], mill": In 1312, the Polish Prince Ladislaus the Elbow-high quelled the Rebellion of wójt Albert in Kraków, populated mostly by Silesian, German and Czech citizens. Anyone over the age of 7 who could not pronounce these Polish words was put to death, ejected from the city or had their property confiscated. 'Ł' (then pronounced as a velarized alveolar lateral approximant, aka dark l) and dental [s̪] are both unlikely to be pronounced properly by Germans since they cannot make out the difference from their own sounds [l] and [s]. (The former was approximated by Germans as l, and has evolved now into a sound similar to English w).

=== Japanese–Korean ===
- Following the 1923 Great Kantō earthquake, which occurred in an area with a high Korean population, there were rumors that the local Korean population poisoned the wells. The locals accosted random people with Japanese phrases that were difficult to pronounce for non-native speakers, resulting in the killings of ethnic Koreans. Many ethnic Chinese were also killed as they were also unable to correctly pronounce the shibboleths. An unforeseen consequence of the hysteria-induced killings was that some ethnic Japanese from outlying regions, such as Okinawa, were also killed as they had accents that sounded strange to the paranoid locals. The phrase 15.50 Yen (十五円五十銭, Jūgoen gojissen) was one of the shibboleths used to Koreans, as pronouncing voiced consonants were difficult for them.

=== Ukrainian–Russian ===
- Palianytsia: a type of Ukrainian bread. During the 2022 Russian invasion of Ukraine, the word palianytsia (Ukrainian: паляниця, [pɐlʲɐˈnɪt͡sʲɐ]) became one of those proposed to use to identify Russian subversive reconnaissance groups, as it is unlikely to be pronounced properly by Russians due to different phonetics of the Russian language, according to apostrophe.ua. On Russian state television, Russia-1 television host Olga Skabeyeva pronounced this word as "polyanitsa" and said that it means strawberry, confusing it with another Ukrainian word, polunytsia (Ukrainian: полуниця, [pɔlʊˈnɪt͡sʲɐ]).

=== Culture, religion and language-specific shibboleths ===
- English-speaking Allied personnel in Europe, during the Second World War, frequently made use of passwords in which labio-velar approximants (w-sounds) or voiceless dental fricatives (th-sounds) were prominent, as these are unusual in spoken German, and the letter w is normally pronounced "v" by native speakers of German. For instance, following D-Day (1944) US forces used the challenge-response "Flash" – "Thunder" – "Welcome".
- American soldiers could ferret out German infiltrators during their time in the Western Front. German spies were taught British English, which was different from American English. For example, Britons used the word lorry rather than the American term truck. American soldiers used such words as a shibboleth to distinguish Nazi spies.
- Israeli forces during the 1948 Palestine war used passwords chosen to contain voiceless bilabial stops (p-sounds), which are not found in Arabic, and which native speakers of Arabic often replace with a voiced bilabial stop (b-sounds).
- In the Lebanese Civil War of 1975, Christian Lebanese soldiers targeted suspected Palestinians at checkpoints by asking how they pronounced the Arabic word for "tomato", which is pronounced "banadoura" in Lebanese Arabic and "bandoura" in Palestinian Arabic. If they said the former, they were let through; if they said the latter, they were shot on the spot.
- At the Battle of Mount Tumbledown in the 1982 Falklands War, the Scots Guards replaced the established passwords for their night attack with the phrase "Hey Jimmie", because the Spanish-speaking Argentinians would have difficulty pronouncing the English consonant "J".
- During the Somali Islamic terrorist group al-Shabaab's 2013 shooting and hostage siege attack on the Westgate shopping mall in Nairobi, Kenya, the attackers asked for Islamic prophet Muhammad's mother Aminah bint Wahb's name and the shahada as religious shibboleths to determine Muslims and non-Muslims. Muslims were freed, while non-Muslims were targeted. An Indian man who could not name Aminah was shot dead.
- The mostly Christian Filipino ground troops fighting in the 2013 Zamboanga City crisis used the Lord's Prayer as a way to identify Moro insurgents. Those who could not recite the Lord's Prayer in any Philippine language, including English, were immediately suspected of being part of the armed Moro National Liberation Front and detained. All non-Christians, including non-combatant Muslims, would also fail the test.
- During the 2025 Pahalgam attack carried out by the Islamist terrorist group The Resistance Front (a proxy of Lashkar-e-Taiba) in the Baisaran Valley of the Indian-administered Jammu and Kashmir, the attackers used religious shibboleths to identify victims. The militants asked tourists to recite the Islamic Kalima (the Muslim declaration of faith) and checked for circumcision. to distinguish between Muslims and non-Muslims.

== Other non-English shibboleths ==
=== Hebrew ===
- Most Israelis pronounce the Hebrew word for 200 as mataim, but in Jerusalem it is pronounced as ma'ataim.

=== Danish ===
- Rødgrød med fløde ("red pudding with cream") is known as a notoriously difficult phrase for non-Danish speakers to pronounce.

=== Dutch ===
- The sentence De zon in de zee zien zakken (Eye dialect: De son in de see sien sakke) 'to see the sun go under the sea', pronounced [də ˈsɔn ɪn də ˈsei sin ˈsɑkə] (or, in broader accents, [də ˈɕɔn ɪn də ˈɕei ɕin ˈɕɑkə]) is used to identify speakers of the Amsterdam dialect, who lack the /z/ phoneme. The standard Dutch pronunciation of that sentence is [də ˈzɔn ɪn də ˈzeː zin ˈzɑkə(n)]. Contrary to the stereotype, any prevocalic ⟨z⟩ can be voiced in Amsterdam, but then so can any prevocalic ⟨s⟩ through the process of hypercorrection (so that suiker 'sugar', pronounced [ˈsœykər] in Standard Dutch may be pronounced [ˈzɐykər] (spelled zuiker in eye dialect) in Amsterdam).

== English shibboleths for native speakers or local natives ==
- Fish and chips: The accents of Australians and New Zealanders seem very similar, and the term fish and chips is sometimes evoked to illustrate a major difference between the two. In New Zealand pronunciation short i is a central vowel, [ɘ]. This vowel sound is sometimes caricatured as "fush and chups" by Australians. The Australian pronunciation has the front vowel [ɪ] (which is more common in most varieties of English) which, due to an overall vowel shift in New Zealand, sounds like "feesh and cheeps" to the ears of a New Zealander, sounding like an instance of the "Fill–feel merger".
- Pronunciation of letters of the alphabet:
  - H: in Northern Ireland pronounced 'aitch' by Protestants, and 'haitch' by Catholics, per Hiberno-English. Also often pronounced 'haitch' in dialects of English spoken in former colonies of Africa, Asia, and the Pacific, usually among non-native English speakers, but in the case of Australia, also among native speakers, especially those of Irish descent.
  - Z: pronounced zee in the United States and the Philippines; typically zed in the Commonwealth. Known in American history and popular culture for distinguishing American males who fled to Canada from the US to escape the military draft in the 1950s and 60s. The Canadian pronunciation was featured in the Molson Canadian I Am Canadian advertisement in 2000.

=== Place-name pronunciations ===
==== In Australia ====
- Castlemaine, Victoria: pronounced /ˈkæsəlmeɪn/ KASS-əl-mayn by the locals and /ˈkɑːsəlmeɪn/ KAH-səl-mayn by those Australians who have a more extensive trap-bath split (see Variation in Australian English).
- Melbourne, Victoria: Generally pronounced locally as /ˈmɛlbən/, non-Australians, particularly from the UK or USA often pronounce it as /ˈmɛlbɔːrn/, as in Melbourne, Derbyshire.

==== In Canada ====
- Calgary, Alberta: residents pronounce the name with two syllables, /ˈkælɡriː/ KAL-gree, while others pronounce it /ˈkælɡəri/ KAL-gər-ee.
- Montréal, Québec: Anglophone Montrealers pronounce the name of their city with the STRUT vowel in the first syllable, thus: /ˌmʌntriˈɔːl/ MUN-tree-AWL. The tendency of English speakers, usually from the US, to pronounce the first syllable with the LOT vowel (thus /ˌmɒntriˈɔːl/ MON-tree-AWL), immediately marks them as Americans to local ears. (However, Francophone Montrealers pronounce it [mɔ̃ʁeal], at least in their native French.)
- Newfoundland: Some outsiders pronounce the island name almost as if it were three separate words, /njuːˈfaʊndlənd/ new-FOWND-lənd rather than the local pronunciation, /ˌnjuːfənˈlænd/ NEW-fən-LAND, rhyming with "understand".
- Regina, Saskatchewan: Pronounced /rɪˈdʒaɪnə/ rij-EYE-nə, rhyming with "vagina". Familiarity with the standard pronunciation may in some cases distinguish Canadians from Americans.
- Saskatchewan: Most Canadians will pronounce the name of this province with a schwa in all syllables except the second, where the stress is placed: sə-SKATCH-wən or sə-SKATCH-ə-wən (/səˈskætʃəwən/). Some locals, particularly in rural areas, may even condense the name further to two syllables: /skætʃwən/ SKATCH-wən. In contrast, outsiders frequently stress the first syllable and fully pronounce all of its vowels: /ˈsæskætʃuɒn/ SASK-atch-choo-on.
- Toronto, Ontario: Toronto is sometimes pronounced with the first syllable elided as if it were a two-syllable word: /ˈtrɒntoʊ/ "Tronto". Stronger local forms are /təˈrɒntə/ "Toronta" and /ˈtrɒntə/ "Tronta", with the GOAT vowel reduced to a schwa. However, they are both more noticeable and generally less approved of, possibly because they deviate far enough from the spelling as to make the speaker sound potentially semiliterate. This shibboleth was referenced in the movie Argo.
- Vancouver, British Columbia: Some Vancouver residents may pronounce the city’s name as though there were a “g” between the first two syllables: /væŋˈkuːvər/ vang-KOO-vər.

==== In Ireland ====
- Dublin has several places with counterintuitive pronunciations:
  - Aungier Street: pronounced /ˈeɪndʒər/ to rhyme with "danger."
  - D'Olier Street: pronounced /dəˈlɪər/ (də-LEER)
  - Dorset Street: pronounced /dɔːrˈsɛt/ with stress on the second syllable, although placing the stress on the first syllable (like the English county) is increasingly common.
  - Iveagh Gardens and other places in Dublin named for the Earls of Iveagh are generally pronounced /ˈaɪviː/ (like "ivy"), although in Ulster (the location of the place from which the title derives) "Iveagh" is typically pronounced /ˈaɪvə/ EYE-və.
  - Jobstown: pronounced /ˈdʒoʊbz.taʊn/, like the Biblical Job.
  - Ranelagh: Locals, especially longtime residents, pronounce it /ˈrɛnələ/ (REN-əl-ə), while others, including the Luas (tram) announcer, pronounce it /ˈrænələ/ RAN-əl-ə.
  - Tallaght: /ˈtælə/
- Drogheda: mostly pronounced /ˈdrɔːdə/ by locals whereas outsiders typically pronounce it /ˈdrɒhədə/

==== In Malaysia ====
- Genting Highlands: Malaysians pronounce it as /ˈɡəntɪŋ/ (with a hard /ɡ/), whereas in English tends to be /ˈdʒɛntɪŋ/.

==== In New Zealand ====
- Bluff: The town of Bluff is almost always referred to by locals with the definite article as "The Bluff".
- Central Otago: Whereas most New Zealanders would talk about travelling to Central Otago or being in Central Otago, locals refer to travelling or being "up Central".
- Otago: Older residents will often end and begin the region's name with a schwa as /ə.'tɑː.gə/ rather than the usual rounded "o" (/oʊ.'tɑː.goʊ/).
- Saint Arnaud: While the official pronunciation is the same as would be expected from a French-language name (/'ɑː.noʊ/), locals often voice the name's end as /'ɑː.nəd/.
- Waiwera South: Officially pronounced as /waɪ.'wɛər.ə/, older locals will often use the non-standard /'waɪ.vrə/.
- West Coast and East Coast: Without context or further description, among New Zealanders "The East Coast" usually refers to the northeast of the North Island, whereas "The West Coast" usually refers to the west coast of the South Island.

Various town and street names are pronounced in counter-intuitive ways. These include:

- Antigua Street, Christchurch: pronounced /æn.'tɪ.giːu.ər/.
- Eltham: Although named after Eltham in England, the town's name is pronounced /'ɛl.θəm/, not /'ɛlt.həm/ or /'ɛl.təm/.
- Filleul Street, Dunedin: pronounced /fɪ.'luː.əl/.
- Jervois Street, Dunedin: pronounced /'dʒər.vɔɪs/.
- Levin: pronounced /lə.'vɪn/.
- Te Puke: pronounced /te.'pʊ.ke/.

==== In the United Kingdom ====
- Belvoir Park, Belfast: Another French derived place name in Belfast. Belfast locals pronounce it /ˈbiːvər/ BEE-vər, as in "beaver", instead of the French-influenced pronunciation such as /bɛlˈvwɑːr/ bel-VWAR.
- Boucher Road, Belfast: Despite its derivation from the French word for 'butcher', Belfast locals pronounce it /ˈbaʊtʃər/ BOW-chər, as in "voucher", instead of a French-influenced pronunciation such as /buːˈʃeɪ/ boo-SHAY.
- Kingston upon Hull, Sunderland, and many other cities and towns in Northern England and the Midlands are pronounced with /ʊ/ by the locals (/ˈhʊl/ HUUL, /ˈsʊndərlənd/ SUUN-dər-lənd) and /ʌ/ in Scotland, Southern England and most of Wales (/ˈhʌl/ HUL, /ˈsʌndərlənd/ SUN-dər-lənd).
- Magdalene College and Magdalene Bridge, Cambridge: In both cases, locals pronounce Magdalene as /ˈmɔːdlɪn/ MAWD-lin.
- Magdalen Street, Oxford: The street is pronounced as /ˈmæɡdəlɪn/ MAG-dəl-in while the name of the College is always /ˈmɔːdlɪn/ MAWD-lin. This inconsistency has non-locals mispronouncing one or the other, regardless of their default way of pronouncing the name.
- Newcastle Upon Tyne: The name is pronounced with penultimate stress and a short /æ/ in the region (/njuːˈkæsəl/ new-KASS-əl), whereas in the southeast of England it has an initial stress and a long /ɑː/: /ˈnjuːkɑːsəl/ NEW-kah-səl.

==== In the United States ====
- Albany, New York: Locals pronounce the first syllable as "all" (/ˈɔːlbəni/ AWL-bən-ee), whereas many non-locals pronounce the first syllable like the male name "Al" (cf. Albany, Western Australia)
- Amherst, Massachusetts: Locals do not pronounce the "h".
- Appalachia: Residents of the region pronounce it as /ˌæpəˈlætʃə/, with short vowels, but non-locals rather pronounce it as /ˌæpəˈleɪtʃə, -ʃə/. The name was originally Native American, but came to English via Spanish as the local pronunciation is based on the Spanish equivalent.
- Auchentoroly Terrace is a neighborhood and street in Baltimore, Maryland which is often cited as a name that people from outside the city are unlikely to know how to pronounce.
- Berlin Turnpike in Central Connecticut. People from out of town pronounce it like the city in Germany: /bərˈlɪn/ bər-LIN. However, locals pronounce it /ˈbɜːrlən/ BUR-lən.
- Boise, Idaho: The city's name is commonly pronounced /ˈbɔɪzi/ BOY-zee. However, locals actually pronounce it as /ˈbɔɪsi/ BOY-see.
- Botetourt County, Virginia: Outsiders may pronounce this county in southwestern Virginia as /ˈboʊtətoʊrt / BOW-tə-tourt or /ˈbɑtətoʊrt/ BOT-ə-tourt). The actual pronunciation is /ˈbɒtətɒt/ BOT-ə-tot.
- Buena Vista, Colorado. Unlike other places bearing this name in the United States (typical pronunciations include /ˌbwɛnə ˈvɪstə, ˌbweɪ-, -ˈviːs-/ BWEN-ə VISS-tə, BWAY-, -VEESS-) the town in Colorado is called /ˌbjuːnə ˈvɪstə/ BEW-nə VISS-tə by locals. Buena Vista, Virginia, is pronounced the same way.
- Portland, Oregon's Couch Street is pronounced /kuːtʃ/, rhyming with "pooch," unlike the identically spelled sofa synonym pronounced /kaʊtʃ/.
- Dacula, Georgia: Residents local to Gwinnett County pronounce the city as /dəˈkjuːlə/ də-KEW-lə while those unfamiliar with the area may pronounce the name of the town as /ˈdækʊlə/ DAK-uul-ə. Gwinnett County and the city of Gwinnett, GA itself is subject to a shibboleth. The names are pronounced by locals as /ɡwɪnˈɛt/ gwi-NET with the stress on the second syllable. Many visitors to the region pronounce it as /ˈɡwɪnət/ GWIH-nət stressing the first syllable and pronouncing the second syllable with little emphasis.
- Detroit: Most residents (as well as most speakers of African-American Vernacular English) pronounce it as /ˈdiːtrɔɪt/ with the stress on the first syllable, while non-locals pronounce it as (/dɪˈtrɔɪt/), with the stress on the second syllable.
- Forked River, New Jersey: Locals pronounce the first word as /ˈfɔːrkɪd/ FOR-kid, while most visitors pronounce it as /fɔːrkt/ FORKT.
- Houston Street in Manhattan is a common differentiator between tourists and those who live in the city. Tourists tend to pronounce it like the name of the city in Texas, while the local pronunciation is HOW-stun (/ˈhaʊstən/).
- Hull, Massachusetts, would seem to be pronounced /hʌl/, as in the exterior of a ship, but locals will invariably render it /hɔːl/ homophonous to "hall", as in a corridor.
- Hurricane, West Virginia: Residents pronounce it as /ˈhɜːrʌkɪn/ HUR-uh-kin, while non-residents pronounce it like the weather phenomenon, /ˈhɜːrɪkeɪn/ HUR-i-cayn.
- Long Island, New York: Residents pronounce it as /lɔːŋˈɡaɪlənd/ while non-residents pronounce it as /lɔːŋ ˈaɪlənd/. See wikt:Lawn Guyland.
- Kuykendahl Road, Houston, Texas: Non-locals will try to sound this out, but most locals know to pronounce it as KIRK-en-doll or /kɜːrkɪndɔːl/.
- Kissimmee, Florida: Residents pronounce it as /kɪˈsɪmi/ kih-SIM-ee, while non-residents often pronounce it as /kɪsəmiː/ KISS-ə-mee.
- Los Feliz, Los Angeles, California: The name is pronounced by many locals as /loʊs ˈfiːlɪs/ lohs-FEEL-ihs, but many Angelinos of Hispanic descent will use the Latin American Spanish pronunciation: [los ˌfeˈlis].
- Louisville, Kentucky: The dominant local pronunciation is /ˈluːəvəl/ LOO-ə-vəl. However, non-locals will usually use /ˈluːiːvɪl/ LOO-ee-vil.
- Manvel, Texas: Pronounced by locals as /ˈmænvɪl/ MAN-vihl, but outsiders may pronounce it as /ˈmænvɛl/ MAN-vehl.
- Miami, Oklahoma: Locals from northeastern Oklahoma pronounce the name as /maɪˈæmə/ my-AM-ə, while others pronounce the name like the city in Florida, /maɪˈæmi/ my-AM-ee.
- Mobile, Alabama: City is pronounced /moʊˈbiːl/ moh-BEEL, while many non-local/regional residents pronounce it as /ˈmoʊbəl/ MO-bul similar to the common pronunciations of mobile phone or mobile home.
- Moyock, North Carolina: Locals pronounce it as /ˈmoʊjɒk/ MOH-yok, while most visitors pronounce it as /ˈmɔɪɒk/ MOY-ok.
- Natchitoches, Louisiana: Locals will recognize the city and parish name as being pronounced /ˈnækətɪʃ/ NAK-ə-tish while people unfamiliar with the name may pronounce it as /ˌnætʃɪˈtoʊʃɪz/ NATCH-ih-TOH-shiz or similar.
- Nevada: Nevadans (and other people who live in the Western US) say /nɪˈvædə/ niv-AD-ə. Visitors from outside the Western US often say /nɪˈvɑːdə/ niv-AH-də. Additionally, there are a number of smaller towns in other states bearing the name Nevada pronounced yet another way, such as /nɪˈveɪdə/ niv-AY-də in Nevada, Missouri, and Nevada County, Arkansas.
- Newark, Delaware: The town is pronounced /ˈnjuːɑːrk/ NEW-ark though many outsiders will conflate the pronunciation with Newark, New Jersey, pronounced /ˈnjuːərk/ NEW-ərk.
- New Haven, Connecticut: The city is pronounced noo-HAY-vən by locals, but NOO-hay-vən by many outsiders.
- Hampton Roads, Virginia: Locals pronounce the name of Norfolk, Virginia, as /ˈnɔːrfʊk/ NOR-fuuk, while most visitors pronounce it as /ˈnɔːrfoʊlk/ NOR-fohlk. Similarly, Suffolk, Virginia, is pronounced as /ˈsʌfʊk/ SUF-uuk by locals and as /ˈsʌfoʊlk/ SUF-ohlk by visitors (but not British visitors, who are likely to render the names as /ˈnɔːrfək/ NOR-fək and /ˈsʌfək/ SUF-ək, following the British pronunciation of the counties in East Anglia).
- Pierre: South Dakotans read the name as /pɪər/ rhyming with "beer," not like the French given name French pronunciation: [pjɛʁ] or the anglicized form pee-AIR /ˈpi.ɛər/.
- Prescott, Arizona: Arizonans pronounce the name as /ˈprɛskɪt/ PRESS-kit, rhyming with "bit", while non-Arizonans pronounce it as /ˈprɛskɒt/ PRESS-kot, rhyming with "got".
- Punta Gorda, Florida: Locals will pronounce it /ˈpʌntə ˈɡɔːrdə/ PUN-tə GOR-də whereas others tend to pronounce the first component as /ˌpʊntə/ PUUN-tə, more in line with its Spanish origin.
- Quincy, Massachusetts: The city's name is commonly pronounced by non-locals as /ˈkwɪnsi/ KWIN-see. However, locals will pronounce it /ˈkwɪnzi/ KWIN-zee.
- Schuylkill River, Pennsylvania: Located in eastern Pennsylvania, this name of this river is said to be a Dutch translation of the original Leni Lenape name. Outsiders often have great difficulty pronouncing the name — and, when sounded out, say /ˈskuːlkɪl/ SKOOL-kil. Locals, however, pronounce the name as /ˈskuːkəl/ SKOO-kəl.
- Staunton, Virginia: Named for Lady Rebecca Staunton, this city in the Shenandoah Valley is sometimes pronounced by outsiders as /ˈstɔːntən/ STAWN-tən. However, similarly to Norfolk, British visitors will likely pronounce it, correctly, as /ˈstæntən/ STAN-tən.
- Tchoupitoulas Street in New Orleans, Louisiana: Pronounced (/ˌtʃɒpɪˈtuːləs/ chop-ih-TOO-ləss). The inability to pronounce the name is often seen as a mark of outsiders.
- The US state of Oregon is home to a county, city, river, bay, state forest, museum, Native American tribe, and dairy processing company called Tillamook. Residents pronounce it as /ˈtɪləmʊk/, rhyming with "book", while nonresidents often mistakenly say /ˈtɪləmuːk/, rhyming with "spook".
- Tulalip, Washington: Locals pronounce it with the stress on the penultimate: /tʊˈleɪlɪp/ tuu-LAY-lip. Some non-locals analyze it by extension from tulip and try /ˈtuːləlɪp/ TOO-lə-lip.
- Zion National Park, Utah: Locals of southern Utah typically pronounce the park as /ˈzaɪ.ən/, rhyming with "lion", while interstate or international visitors will often pronounce it as /ˈzaɪˌɒn/, rhyming with "spy on."

=== Place-name terms ===
- In Southern California, locals generally use the article "the" preceding the number of a freeway. Northern California locals generally do not use "the" before a numerical freeway name. For example, Southern Californians usually refer to Highway 101 as "The 101," whereas Northern Californians will refer to it as simply "101." By comparison, people in the rest of the United States more often precede a freeway's route number with its highway classification, as in "U.S. 101" for a Federal highway or "Interstate 5" or "I-5" for an interstate highway.
- Long-time and/or Democratic residents of Washington, D.C., often refer to Reagan National Airport by its older nickname, "National," out of habit or political pique, while Republicans and visitors are more likely to call it “Reagan National”.
- Additionally, some residents of the Washington, D.C. metropolitan area will refer to it as "The DMV" (the District, Maryland, and Virginia, specifically referencing the Fairfax, Alexandria, and Arlington Counties of Virginia; the city itself; and the Montgomery and Prince George's Counties of Maryland). This frequently leads to outsiders confusing it with the local Department of Motor Vehicles or "Delmarva", the portmanteau of Delaware, Maryland, and Virginia (referring to the combined areas of the Eastern Shore of Maryland, Eastern Shore of Virginia, and Delaware), both of which can also be abbreviated to "DMV".
- In the San Francisco Bay Area, San Francisco is generally referred to by its full name, "SF", or "the City". In contrast, outsiders will often say "San Fran", clearly distinguishing themselves from locals.

=== Given names and surnames ===
- Stephen Curry II, who pronounces his given name "Stefan" (as per family tradition)
- Ralph Fiennes, whose given name is pronounced "Rafe" as per traditional British English (similarly to the silent L in "Holmes")
- Antawn Jamison, intended to be spelled "Antwan" and so pronounced as "Antoine"
- Annastacia Palaszczuk, who uses the invented surname pronunciation PAL-ə-shay
- Dwyane Wade Jr., whose name is pronounced either per its spelling, or as "Dwayne"
- MaliVai Washington, pronounced "Malivia"

=== Other ===
In the 1949 British film Obsession, a British doctor plots to kill an American visitor who has been seeing his wife. The clue that gives away the doctor to a policeman is his continued use of the Americanism, "thanks, pal." The doctor's use, indicating repeated contact with an American English speaker, attracts the superintendent's suspicions.

== Non-verbal shibboleths ==
=== Hand gestures ===
- When indicating the number three with their fingers, British people typically raise their index, middle, and ring fingers, while Germans usually use the thumb, index, and middle fingers. This shibboleth served as a key plot device in the film Inglourious Basterds, where a group of Allied spies posing as Germans are unmasked after one of them reveals their true identity by using the non-German gesture when ordering three drinks.

=== Written format ===
- The number 7 can sometimes be written with a short horizontal bar to cross the vertical line in the middle (~~7~~), to distinguish the seven from a numeral 1; historically this was more common on the European continent. In the 1942 British Second World War film Went the Day Well?, the German way of writing a 7 gives away the nationality of a German soldier to a British person who notices it.

== See also ==
- Cant (language), which often intentionally hides meaning
- Language analysis for the determination of origin
- Slang, which often performs a similar function for a group
