= Shiro Azuma =

Japanese soldier

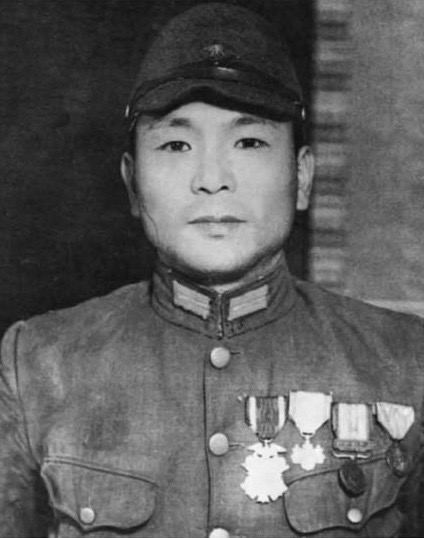
- Native name: 東 史郎
- Born: April 27, 1912; Japan
- Died: January 3, 2006 (aged 93) Kyoto, Japan
- Allegiance: Empire of Japan
- Branch: Imperial Japanese Army
- Conflicts: Second Sino-Japanese War; Battle of Nanking
- Other work: Peace activist

Shiro Azuma (東 史郎, Azuma Shirō; April 27, 1912 – January 3, 2006) was a Japanese soldier who openly admitted his participation in Japanese war crimes against the Chinese during World War II. He was one of the few former soldiers of the Empire of Japan to admit to his participation in the 1937 Nanjing Massacre. After his confession, he visited China seven times to apologize and help Chinese scholars find more evidence of the Japanese soldiers' brutality. He prepared an eighth trip to Nanjing but died of cancer on January 3, 2006 in Kyoto.

== Journal ==
In 1987, Azuma published his diary, My Nanking Platoon, written during his time in China about the Nanjing Massacre. His full diary was published in Japanese in 2001 as Azuma Shiro no Nikki. It has also been published in Chinese, and in English in 2006 as The Diary of Azuma Shiro (translated by Kimberly Hughes and published by the Phoenix Publishing Media Group).

In an interview in 1998, Azuma stated the following:

When I tried to cut off the first one, either the farmer moved or I mis-aimed. I ended up slicing off just part of his skull. Blood spurted upwards. I swung again... and this time I killed him... We were taught that we were a superior race since we lived only for the sake of a human god—our emperor. But the Chinese were not. So we held nothing but contempt for them... There were many rapes, and the women were always killed. When they were being raped, the women were human. But once the rape was finished, they became pig's flesh.

— Shiro Azuma

In addition, he described how one of his superior officers, Mitsuharu Hashimoto, allegedly killed a Chinese civilian. Hashimoto was said to have put a Chinese civilian into a mailbag, soaked it with kerosene, and burned the bag to entertain his comrades. Afterwards, he placed a hand grenade inside the bag and threw it into a river in an effort to create a "stimulating high".

== Libel lawsuit ==
I am 86 years old now, but I will fight to death like a young man. This time not for the Emperor, but for justice and history. If the matter is allowed to rest, then obviously the massacre will be treated as fiction and the Japanese people will ignore this piece of history.

— Shiro Azuma, stated in a news conference at the YMCA in Tsim Sha Tsui, Hong Kong

In the diary, Azuma recorded that a group superior put a Chinese citizen into a big mail bag and then by tying the bag to a grenade, cold-bloodedly exploded the bag with its live victim on its way into a pond. After the diary was made public, the group leader, with the support of Kaikosha, a right wing group, charged Azuma with libel. He completely denied that he had committed any war crimes. He argued that a mail bag would not hold a person; the crime spot that is near Nanjing's Supreme Court does not have any pond; and there were no eyewitnesses.

In order to collect more evidence, Azuma went to Nanjing and got support from many Nanjing citizens and the curator of the Nanjing Massacre Memorial Hall, Tsu Cheng-shen. They provided a great deal of physical evidence to help the Japanese lawyers. This evidence included seven Nanjing maps dated December 1937 and two aerial photos. They proved that there were three ponds in the areas. Military maps used by the Japanese army during the Battle of Nanjing were among the maps provided. Tsu Cheng-shen also gave a 1.5 meter rail mail bag to the Japanese lawyers which proved that it could hold the victim. Twenty six area residents who lived close to the crime spot in Nanjing then also provided statements that they witnessed similar cruel war crimes committed by the Japanese army soldiers. Shiro Azuma's defense lawyer Nakakita Ryutaro said, "The reason why Shiro Azuma lost the first trial in April is because the trial judge at the Tokyo Area Court has no understanding of the history of the Nanjing Massacre and was confounded by the right wing group's lies." He thinks the judgment departed from the principle of respecting historical facts.

On March 12, 1998, the 86-year-old appeared before the Japanese Supreme Court to defend his journal as a valid account of the Nanjing Massacre. However, in the year 2000, his appeal was denied by the Japanese Supreme Court. The judge found that despite the testimonies about unrelated acts, the act in question was not physically possible and to attribute it to someone was libelous.

The lawsuits discredited his accounts in Japan, but they became well known in China.

== Banned from entering the U.S. ==
In 1998, U.S. Department of Justice refused to allow Shiro Azuma to enter the United States because he was put on a watch list of suspected war criminals created in 1996 which included 60,000 people. The majority listed in it are German Nazis. Shiro Azuma was intending to join an American lecture during which he was going to apologize, explain and expose what he had done during World War II.

== See also ==
- Japanese war crimes
