= John Rabe (film) =

- Theatrical release poster
- Directed by: Florian Gallenberger
- Written by: Florian Gallenberger
- Produced by: Benjamin Herrmann; Mischa Hofmann; Jan Mojto
- Starring: Ulrich Tukur; Daniel Brühl; Steve Buscemi; Anne Consigny; Jingchu Zhang
- Cinematography: Jürgen Jürges
- Edited by: Hansjörg Weißbrich
- Music by: Annette Focks
- Production companies: Majestic Filmproduktion; Canal+; Huayi Brothers; France 2 Cinéma; Antena 3 Films; Rai Cinema; ORF
- Distributed by: 20th Century Fox (Germany); Aramis Films (France); Huayi Brothers (China)
- Release dates: 2 April 2009 (Germany); 29 April 2009 (China); 27 April 2011 (France)
- Running time: 134 minutes
- Countries: Germany; China; France
- Languages: Mandarin Chinese; Cantonese; German; English; Japanese; Ukrainian
- Budget: USD$20 million
- Box office: $1.5 million

John Rabe (released in the United Kingdom as City of War: The Story of John Rabe) is a 2009 biographical film directed by Florian Gallenberger, based upon John Rabe's published wartime diaries.

An international co-production between Germany, China and France, the film focuses upon the experiences of Rabe (Ulrich Tukur), a German businessman who used his Nazi Party membership to create a protective International Safety Zone in Nanjing, China, helping to save over 200,000 Chinese from the Nanjing Massacre in late 1937 and early 1938. The massacre and its associated atrocities were committed subsequent to the Battle of Nanjing by the invading Imperial Japanese Army after they defeated the Chinese Nationalist forces defending the city during the Second Sino-Japanese War.

Filming commenced in 2007, and it premiered at the 59th Berlin International Film Festival on 7 February 2009. Upon release, it did not receive theatrical distribution in Japan and was the subject of vociferous refutations by Japanese ultranationalists who denied the events ever took place. The film was released elsewhere to mixed critical reception.

== Plot ==
The film begins in Nanjing during late 1937, where German businessman John Rabe, director of the local Siemens subsidiary, and his wife Dora have resided for almost thirty years. The thought of transferring management to his successor Fliess and returning to Berlin is a substantial professional setback for him. During the farewell ball in his honour, Nanjing is bombarded by planes of the Japanese air forces. Rabe opens the company gate and saves the panicked civilians.

While the fires are being put out the next morning and the damages are inspected, the remaining foreigners in the city discuss what they can do in the face of the threat. Dr. Rosen, a German Embassy Attache of partly Jewish descent, reports about Shanghai where a safety zone was established for civilians. His suggestion of a similar zone is warmly supported by his superior, Ambassador Trautmann, and Valérie Dupres, director of the International Girls College. John Rabe is nominated as the chairman of the international committee, since he is a German "ally" of the Japanese. The committee meets, though with the initial reluctance of Dr. Robert O. Wilson, the American head doctor of a local hospital, who harbors ideological antipathy towards the German "Nazi" Rabe. The next day, Rabe sends his wife back to Germany. Tragically, the ship is bombed, and the passengers on board are killed, presumably including his wife.

Meanwhile, Japanese forces have captured many National Revolutionary Army soldiers during a battle outside of Nanjing. Nanjing is then brutally overrun. John Rabe and the international committee however manage to have the Nanjing Safety Zone recognized by the Japanese authorities. Hundreds of thousands seek refuge; more than anticipated and overstretching the committee's resources. Further atrocities follow, and every member of the committee tries their best to keep these innocent people safe. Mme. Dupres stoutly refuses to give up the Chinese soldiers hidden in the attic of the Girls College.

Under all the stress, Dr. Wilson and Rabe become friends, drinking, singing, and playing the piano together. The committee celebrates Christmas. Some packages have made it to them from the outside world. Rabe even gets an unmarked one. It is a Gugelhupf cake. Rabe faints as he realizes that his wife must have sent him this, his favorite cake, as a secret message that she is safe and well. His friends rush to his aid. Dr. Wilson discovers that Rabe is diabetic and has run out of insulin. The doctor manages then to procure some vital insulin from the Japanese authorities.

Life, and survival, become more desperate in the new year. Rabe offers his last savings to buy supplies. As Japanese troops march up to the gates of the zone, Chinese civilians form human shields together with the international committee. Japanese tanks are brought into position as well, but before a shot can be fired, the horn of a steamboat signals the return of Western diplomats and journalists.

The film ends with Rabe making his farewells. Carrying a small suitcase, he is escorted by a troupe of Japanese through the ruins of Nanjing to the harbour. There he is recognized and cheered by the Chinese. Finally, he is reunited with his wife on the pier.

== Cast ==
- Ulrich Tukur as John Rabe
- Daniel Brühl as Dr. Georg Rosen
- Steve Buscemi as Dr. Robert O. Wilson
- Jingchu Zhang as Langshu
- Anne Consigny as Valérie Dupres
- Dagmar Manzel as Dora Rabe
- Gottfried John as German Ambassador Oskar Trautmann
- Teruyuki Kagawa as Prince Yasuhiko Asaka
- Yu Fang as Han
- Mathias Herrmann as Jochen Fließ
- Akira Emoto as General Iwane Matsui
- Christian Rodska as Dr. Lewis Smythe
- Christoph Hagen Dittmann as Christian Kröger
- Togo Igawa as Ambassador Fukuda Tokoyasu
- Shaun Lawton as Reverend John Magee
- Arata as Major Ose
- Tetta Sugimoto as Lieutenant-General Kesago Nakajima
- Hans-Eckart Eckhardt as German Embassy Clerk
- Hans Joachim Heist as Scheel
- Ming Li as Chang
- Yuan Wenkang as Gu
- Philipp Keller as Sailor
- Yangyang Qi as Laopo

Most major characters are historically accurate. However, Rabe's important fellow Nanjing Safety Zone committee member Minnie Vautrin, actual director of the Ginling Girls College, is substituted by a fictive French Lady Valérie Dupres of an "International Girls College".

== Production ==
"After such a long time, there should be a way of dealing differently with the responsibility they have, rather than trying to avoid it or make it disappear."

— Director Florian Gallenberger, hoping the film will trigger a new dialogue and help Japan come to terms with its past.

Florian Gallenberger stated that although working with the Chinese censorship authorities was protracted, it was not impossible. The resulting film was deemed satisfactory. International Sino-Japanese politics was a more erratic interference. At one point concern about good relations because of a major gas exploration joint-venture caused production to be halted. When a Japanese school book was published without the inclusion of the Nanjing Massacre however, the go-ahead was given again.

== Awards ==
The film picked up over seven German Film Awards nominations, including Best Film, Best Director (Gallenberger), Best Actor (Tukur) and Best Supporting Actor (for Buscemi, one of the few times that a Lola nomination has been given to a non-German citizen – Buscemi is American). It won the awards for Best Film, Best Actor, Best Production Design and Best Costume Design. Lead actor Ulrich Tukur also won the 2009 Bavarian Film Awards for Best Actor.

== Reception ==
=== Japan ===
In Japan, none of the major film companies were willing to watch the screening. Florian Gallenberger also confirmed those difficulties. The director was asked by one potential Japanese film distributor if they could remove all footage of Prince Asaka, who was commander of the Japanese forces in its final assault on Nanjing, but the director refused. Asaka was the presiding officer under which the order to "kill all captives" was issued, thus providing official sanction for the Nanjing Massacre.

The film, which did not have a theatrical release in Japan and was one of several made commemorating the 70th anniversary of the events of Nanjing, met with vociferous opposition from far-right ultranationalists in Japan who even released a number of Japanese films claiming that the Nanjing Massacre never occurred.

The film finally was shown in Japan on 17 May 2014 by the Film Festival for Preserving the Historical Facts of Nanjing (Japanese: 南京・史実を守る映画祭).

=== United States ===
On Rotten Tomatoes, John Rabe received a rating of 75% based on reviews from 32 critics.

The film, which has been compared to Schindler's List, also met with a favourable reception from The New York Times.

== See also ==
- City of Life and Death, a Chinese film also released in 2009 and about the Rape of Nanjing
- Georg Rosen, another notable member of the International Safety Zone Committee
- The Good Man of Nanking, Rabe's diaries
- Japanese war crimes
- John Rabe
- Nanjing Massacre Memorial Hall
- Nanjing Requiem, a novel by Ha Jin
- Nanking, a U.S. documentary film released in 2007
- Nanjing Massacre
- The Rape of Nanking, a 1997 book by Iris Chang
- Persona Non Grata, A 2015 film about the Japanese vice-consul of Lithuania, Chiune Sugihara who saved thousands of Jewish refugees, during the Holocaust in Lithuania by offering them transit visas to the Japanese Empire
