= Nanjing Requiem =

2011 book about the Nanjing massacre

Nanjing Requiem 時報文化出版企業股份有限公司
- First edition (publ. Pantheon Books)
- Author: Ha Jin
- Language: English, Chinese
- Publisher: Pantheon Books (English)
- Publication date: 2011
- ISBN: 978-0-307-37976-4 (English)

Nanjing Requiem is a 2011 novel by Chinese-American writer Ha Jin about the Nanjing Massacre.

== Summary ==
The book begins in 1937 and focuses on Vautrin and her work at Ginling College to protect people during the massacre. A teacher named Anling Gao, a middle-aged female assistant to Vautrin, is the novel's narrator. Pin-chia Feng of National Chiao Tung University wrote that while Anling narrates, the novel "unquestionably" makes Vautrin its protagonist.

Anling's son becomes consumed with nationalism. Vautrin herself, as well as John Magee, John Rabe, and Lewis Smythe appear in the work. Vautrin leaves for the United States after Communist officials accuse her of collaborating with the Japanese.

The ending is set in 1947.

Some of the characters speak in American slang characteristic of 2011.

Pin-chia Feng wrote that due to the novel's focus on the women, the author was "deliberately distancing his work from a nationalist stance". Additionally Ha Jin could include criticism of the Communists as he was outside of Mainland China, now controlled by Communists.

== Background ==
Ha Jin wrote this novel in English, his second language.

The author consulted the journals of Minnie Vautrin and other works for research.

== Publication details ==
English and Chinese versions of the novel were published at the same time.

== Reception ==
Isabel Hilton of The New York Times describes the writing as "a cool, spare documentary approach". Hilton praised the fact Ha Jin did not write in his native language but added there was "some awkward phrasing", and she criticized the use of American slang.

Alexander Theroux of the Wall Street Journal wrote that the "didactic, understandably tendentious" book "seems written almost as a duty"; Thereoux added that compared to The Rape of Nanking by Iris Chang, the book "is less expressionistic and more controlled".

Marie Arana of the Washington Post criticized the "surprisingly sterile, drained of the blood" method of writing about incidents and the "textbook" style that action is described, although she stated the author "can sometimes rise to the occasion". Arana stated that within the work "Vautrin is as wooden and lifeless as a marionette" and that the narrator "never quite emerges as a fully realized character" although Arana felt the narrator is written to be "infinitely more human".

Kirkus Reviews praised the "subtle mastery" in the later stages as Anling witnesses atrocities, although in the earlier stage the publication felt that "Anling is neither particularly eloquent nor psychologically astute" and therefore her purpose as a narrator "seems limiting".

Mark Athitakis in the Minneapolis Star Tribune wrote that the work is characterized by "simplicity" in its writing style and a "fatalistic tone"; he criticized how the overly simplified style makes it read like "a grim, plodding accountancy."
