= American Goddess at the Rape of Nanking =

2000 book by Hua-ling Hu

- First edition cover of American Goddess at the Rape of Nanking
- Author: Hua-ling Hu
- Language: English
- Subject: Nanjing Massacre
- Genre: Biography
- Publisher: Southern Illinois University Press
- Publication date: December 2000
- Publication place: United States
- Media type: Print (Hardcover)
- Pages: 232 pp (first edition)
- ISBN: 0-8093-2386-9
- OCLC: 41355746
- Dewey Decimal: 266.0092
- LC Class: BV3427.V38 H813 2000

American Goddess at the Rape of Nanking: The Courage of Minnie Vautrin is a biographical book about American missionary Minnie Vautrin and her experience of the Nanjing Massacre in 1937–1938. Written by historian Hua-ling Hu and published in 2000, the book recounts how Vautrin saved thousands of lives of women and children during the Nanjing Massacre. A notable source for the book were the diaries that Vautrin kept during the massacre; these were discovered by author Iris Chang during the research for her book The Rape of Nanking.

== See also ==
- Finding Iris Chang
- The Good Man of Nanking
