= John Rabe House =

House in Nanjing, China

Coordinates: 32.052726°N 118.778044°E

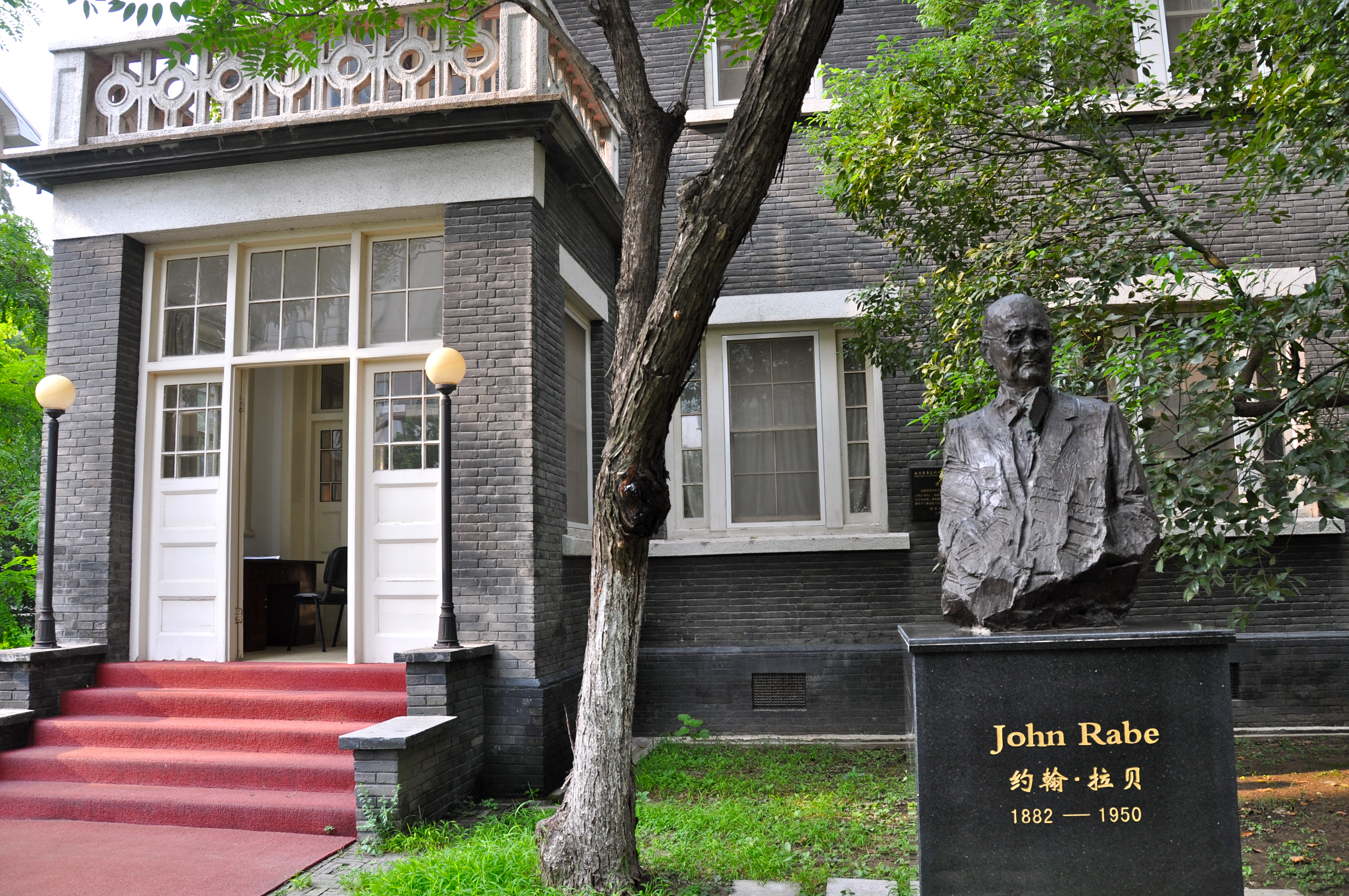
John Rabe's former residence in Nanking (as it was then called when he lived there), July 2008

The John Rabe House (拉贝故居), located at Xiaofenqiao No. 1 (小粉桥1号) in Nanjing, China, was where John Rabe lived during the Nanjing Massacre. In its garden, he protected more than 600 Chinese refugees from Japanese persecution. Today it houses the “John Rabe and International Safety Zone Memorial Hall” and “John Rabe Research and Exchange Centre for Peace and Reconciliation.”

The John Rabe House is located in the center of Nanjing, at southeast corner of the Gulou campus of Nanjing University. John Rabe, former Siemens China Representative and Chairman of the International Committee for the Nanking Safety Zone, resided there from 1932 to 1938. It was also in this house where he wrote the famous “Diaries of John Rabe”.

For almost half a century, Rabe's former residence in Nanking (as it was spelled then) received little recognition, until its location was made known by the publication of Rabe's diaries in December 1996 by his granddaughter Ursula Reinhardt. When German president Johannes Rau visited Nanjing University in 2003, he expressed concern about the dilapidated condition of John Rabe’s former residence. After Rau’s visit and with his encouragement to renovate the house, the project to renovate the residence began in 2005. The Consulate General of the Germany in Shanghai, together with Siemens Ltd. China, Bosch-Siemens Home Appliances signed an agreement with Nanjing University to renovate the house and construct the “John Rabe and International Safety Zone Memorial Hall” and “John Rabe Research and Exchange Centre for Peace and Reconciliation.” The German side was to provide financing while Nanjing University was responsible for the renovation and maintenance of the John Rabe House as well as for the establishment and management of the Memorial Hall and Research Center.

== John Rabe and International Safety Zone Memorial Hall ==
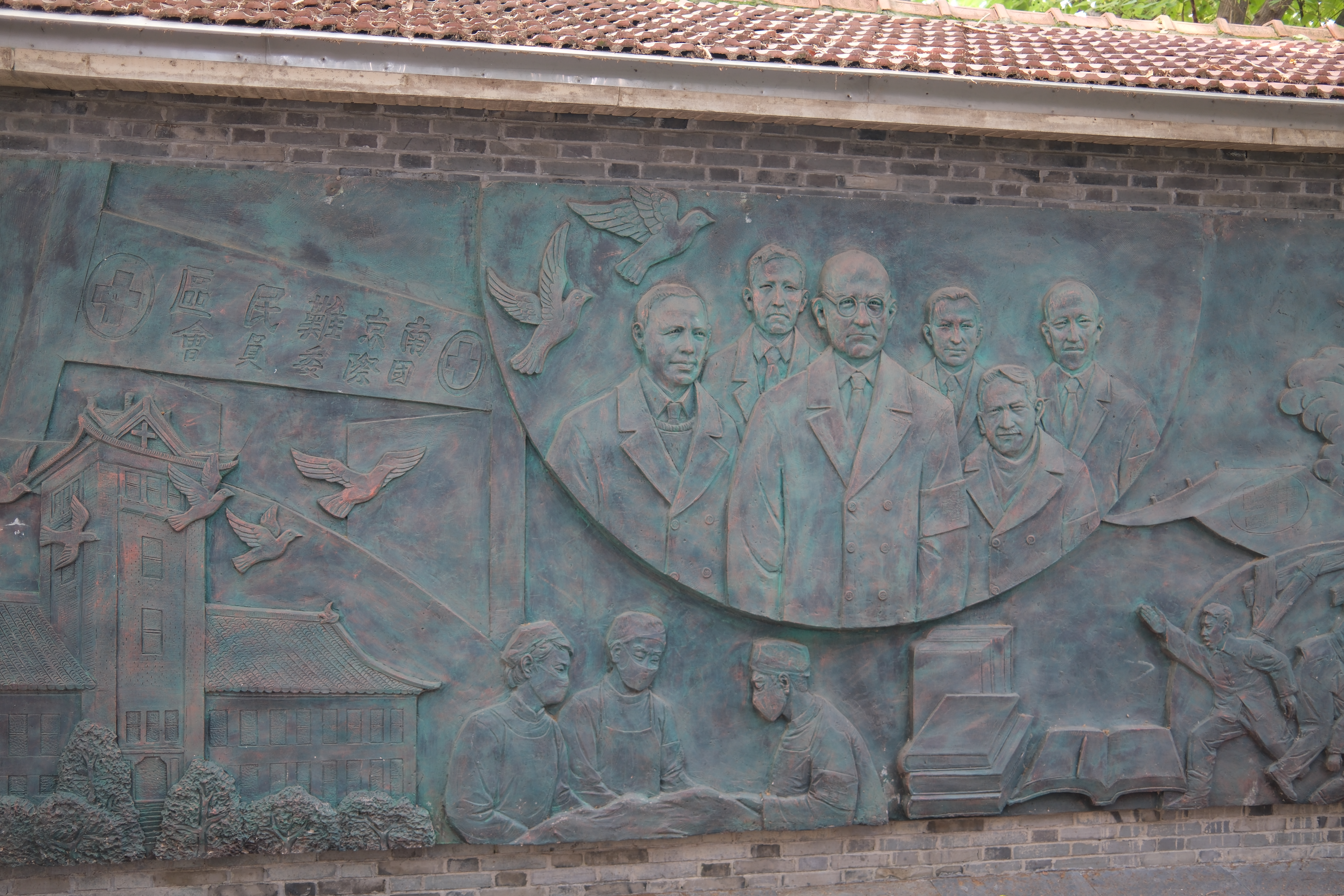
Mural across from the residence. The center six figures are based on a photograph of (left to right) Ernest Forster, Wilson Mills, John Rabe, Lewis Smythe, Edward Sperling, and George Fitch; June 2026

On October 31, 2006, the “John Rabe and International Safety Zone Memorial Hall” officially opened to the public. On 1628 square meters, 6 exhibition areas, more than 300 photographs, files and historical material tell Rabe’s life story. Its main focus is to commemorate the efforts of John Rabe and the other members of the Nanking Safety Zone to save innocent lives during the Nanking Massacre. The Memorial Hall in Rabe’s former residence can be visited Monday – Friday from 8:30 to 16:30. Since 2008, the Austrian Service Abroad has been sending a Peace Servant to work at the Memorial Hall and Exchange Center for one year.

== See also ==
- John Rabe
- Nanjing Massacre
- Nanking Safety Zone
- The Good Man of Nanking
- The International Committee for Nanking Safety Zone
