= The Good Man of Nanking =

Diaries by John Rabe

- First edition cover of The Good Man of Nanking
- Author: John Rabe
- Translator: John E. Woods
- Language: English
- Subject: Nanjing Massacre
- Genre: Autobiography
- Publisher: Knopf Publishing Group
- Publication date: November 1998
- Publication place: United States
- Media type: Print (Hardcover)
- Pages: 384 pp (first edition)
- ISBN: 0-375-40211-X
- OCLC: 38595490
- Dewey Decimal: 951.04/2 21
- LC Class: DS796.N2 R3313 1998

The Good Man of Nanking: The Diaries of John Rabe is a collection of the personal journals of John Rabe, a German businessman who lived in Nanjing at the time of the Nanjing Massacre in 1937–1938. The book contains the diaries that Rabe kept during the Nanjing Massacre, writing from his personal experience and observation of the events that took place. It also excerpts Rabe's experience in immediate post-war Berlin, then occupied by Soviet troops. Rabe's diaries were made known and quoted by author Iris Chang during the research for her book, The Rape of Nanking; they were subsequently translated from German to English by John E. Woods and published in the United States in 1998. The diaries of Rabe could only provide witnesses of a small corner of the Nanjing Massacre, because of the limitation of his activity in the safe zone.

== Diary entries ==
In his diary kept during the aggression to the city and its occupation by the Imperial Japanese Army, John Rabe wrote many comments about Japanese atrocities. For example, on 13 December 1937, he wrote:

"It is not until we tour the city that we learn the extent of destruction. We come across corpses every 100 to 200 yards. The bodies of civilians that I examined had bullet holes in their backs. These people had presumably been fleeing and were shot from behind. The Japanese march through the city in groups of ten to twenty soldiers and loot the shops ... I watched with my own eyes as they looted the café of our German baker Herr Kiessling. Hempel's hotel was broken into as well, as almost every shop on Chung Shang and Taiping Road."

For 17 December:

"Two Japanese soldiers have climbed over the garden wall and are about to break into our house. When I appear they give the excuse that they saw two Chinese soldiers climb over the wall. When I show them my party badge, they return the same way. In one of the houses in the narrow street behind my garden wall, a woman was raped, and then wounded in the neck with a bayonet. I managed to get an ambulance so we can take her to Kulou Hospital. ... Last night up to 1,000 women and girls are said to have been raped, about 100 girls at Ginling Girls' College alone. You hear nothing but rape. If husbands or brothers intervene, they're shot. What you hear and see on all sides is the brutality and bestiality of the Japanese soldiers."

While, on the next day of the fall of Nanjing, Rabe handed a letter of thanks to the Japanese army commander concerning that the people in the Safety Zone could stay without one fire and were all safe. The following is a part of his letter of thanks.

"Dec. 14, 1937, Dear commander of the Japanese army in Nanking, We appreciate that the artillerymen of your army didn't attack the Safety Zone. And we hope to contact with you to make a plan to protect Chinese citizens who are staying in the Safety Zone... We will be pleased to cooperate with you in anyway to protect citizens in this city. --Chairman of the Nanking International Committee, John H. D. Rabe--"

On 17 December, Rabe however wrote a letter as chairman to Kiyoshi Fukui, second secretary of the Japanese Embassy, in a very different tone. The following is an excerpt:

"In other words, on the 13th when your troops entered the city, we had nearly all the civilian population gathered in a Zone in which there had been very little destruction by stray shells and no looting by soldiers even in full retreat. ... All 27 Occidentals in the city at that time and our Chinese population were totally surprised by the reign of robbery, raping and killing initiated by your soldiers on the 14th. All we are asking in our protest is that you restore order among your troops and get the city living normally as soon as possible. In the latter process we are glad to cooperate in any way we can. But even last night between 8 and 9 p.m. when five Occidental members of our staff and Committee toured the Zone to observe conditions, we did not find a single Japanese patrol either in the Zone or at the entrances!"

Having received no answer to his request, Rabe wrote again to Fukui the following day, this time in an even more desperate tone:

"We are sorry to trouble you again but the sufferings and needs of the 200 000 civilians for whom we are trying to care make it urgent that we try to secure action from your military authorities to stop the present disorder among Japanese soldiers wandering through the Safety Zone. [...] The second man in our Housing Commission had to see two women in his family at 23 Hankow Road raped last night at supper time by Japanese soldiers. Our associate food commissioner, Mr. Sone, has to convey trucks with rice and leave 2,500 people in families at his Nanking Theological Seminary to look for themselves. Yesterday, in broad daylight, several women at the Seminary were raped right in the middle of a large room filled with men, women, and children! We 22 Occidentals cannot feed 200,000 Chinese civilians and protect them night and day. That is the duty of the Japanese authorities..."

For 10 February, Rabe wrote in his diary :

"Fukui, whom I tried to find at the Japanese embassy to no avail all day yesterday, paid a call on me last night. He actually managed to threaten me: 'If the newspapers in Shanghai report bad things, you will have the Japanese army against you,' he said. ... In reply to my question as to what I then could say in Shanghai, Fukui said 'We leave that to your discretion.' My response: 'It looks as if you expect me to say something like this to the reporters: The situation in Nanking is improving everyday. Please don't print any more atrocities about the vile behavior of Japanese soldiers, because then you'll only be pouring oil on fire of disagreement that already exists between the Japanese and Europeans.' 'Yes,' he said simply beaming, that would be splendid!'"

John Rabe gave a series of lectures in Germany after he came back to Berlin on 15 April 1938, in which he said, "We Europeans put the number [of civilian casualties] at about 50,000 to 60,000." However, this estimate was just from his personal observation. His witnesses of the Nanjing Massacre only represented a small corner of the Japanese mass killings there.

== See also ==
- American Goddess at the Rape of Nanking
- Finding Iris Chang
- John Rabe (film)
