= Nanking (2007 film) =

- Nanking film poster
- Directed by: Bill Guttentag; Dan Sturman
- Written by: Bill Guttentag; Dan Sturman; Elisabeth Bentley
- Produced by: Ted Leonsis; Bill Guttentag; Michael Jacobs
- Starring: Rosalind Chao; Stephen Dorff; John Getz; Woody Harrelson; Mariel Hemingway; Michelle Krusiec; Jürgen Prochnow; Sonny Saito; Graham Sibley; Robert Wu
- Cinematography: Stephen Kazmierski; Buddy Squires
- Edited by: Hibah Sherif Frisina; Charlton McMillan; Michael Schweitzer
- Music by: Philip Marshall
- Distributed by: Fortissimo Films (world); THINKFilm (U.S.)
- Release dates: January 20, 2007 (Sundance); July 3, 2007 (China)
- Running time: 88 minutes
- Country: United States
- Languages: English; Mandarin (Nanjing dialect); Japanese

Nanking (Chinese: 南京) is a 2007 documentary film about the Nanjing Massacre, committed in 1937 by the Japanese army in the former capital city Nanjing, China. It was inspired by Iris Chang's book The Rape of Nanking (1997), which discussed the persecution and murder of the Chinese by the Imperial Japanese Army in the then-capital of Nanjing at the outset of the Second Sino-Japanese War (1937–45). The film draws on letters and diaries from the era as well as archive footage and interviews with surviving victims and perpetrators of the massacre. Contemporary actors play the roles of the Western missionaries, professors, and businessmen who formed the Nanking Safety Zone to protect the city's civilians from Japanese forces. Particular attention is paid to Nazi Party member John Rabe, a German businessman who organized the Nanking Safety Zone, Robert O. Wilson, a surgeon who remained in Nanjing to care for legions of victims, and Minnie Vautrin, a missionary educator who rendered aid to thousands of Nanjing's women.

== Synopsis ==
In the winter of 1937, the Japanese army occupied Nanjing and killed over 300,000 and raped tens of thousands of Chinese people, one of human history's worst atrocities. In order to protect Chinese civilians, a small group of European and American expatriates, Western missionaries, professors, and businessmen banded together to save 250,000, risking their own lives.

The film describes the Nanjing Massacre by reading from letters and diaries which shows the activities of John Rabe (Jürgen Prochnow), a German businessman, Robert O. Wilson (Woody Harrelson), the only surgeon remaining to care for legions of victims, and Minnie Vautrin (Mariel Hemingway), an educator who passionately defends the lives and honor of Nanjing's women during the war time.

The film includes survivors who tell their own stories, the archival footage of the events, and the testimonies of Japanese soldiers who participated in the rampage.

== Voice actors ==
- Hugo Armstrong – John Magee
- Rosalind Chao – Chang Yu Zheng
- Stephen Dorff – Lewis Smythe
- John Getz – George Ashmore Fitch
- Woody Harrelson – Bob Wilson
- Mariel Hemingway – Minnie Vautrin
- Michelle Krusiec – Yang Shu Ling
- Leah Liang Lewis (as Leah Liang) – Banner Girl
- Chris Mulkey – Mills McCallum
- Jürgen Prochnow – John Rabe
- Sonny Saito – Higashi Sakai
- Graham Sibley – Miner Searle Bates
- Mark Valley – Stage Manager
- Robert Wu – Li Pu

== Production ==
The film was conceptualized and funded by AOL Vice-Chairman Ted Leonsis. While on vacation during the Christmas of 2005 in St. Bart's, Leonsis read The Rape of Nanking after seeing the obituary for the book's author, Iris Chang. The book inspired Leonsis to research the massacre further and eventually led to his creation of the film project.

Leonsis had expressed his desire for the film to be released theatrically, as well as on DVD, television, and cable. He hopes to use local DVD sales as an advertising platform for businesses that want to break into the Chinese market. He also expressed interest in making the film available for free online, saying "We'll get a sponsor", "I'm not worried about piracy. I want people to share the movie."

== Release and reaction ==
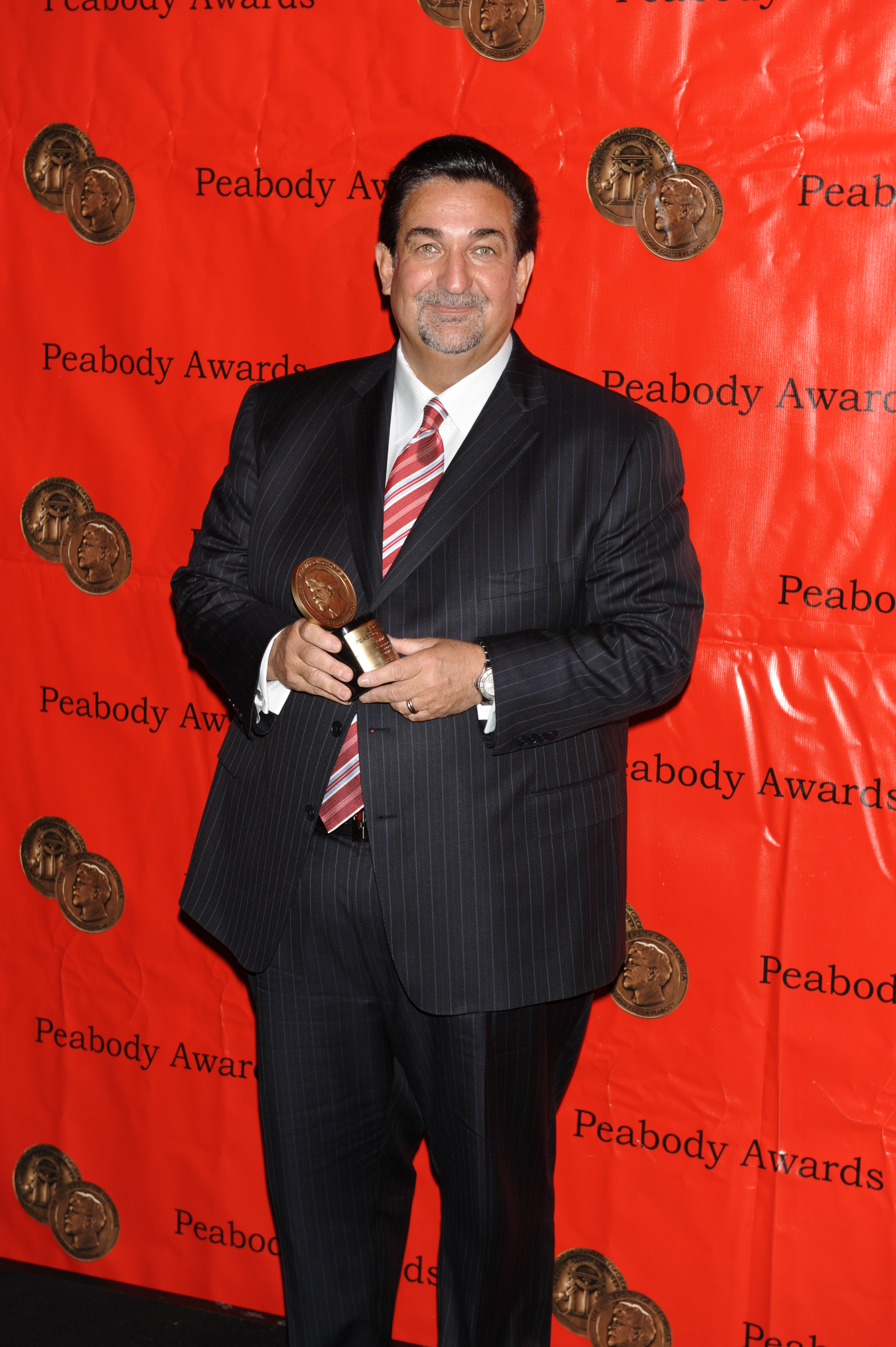
Ted Leonsis at the 68th Annual Peabody Awards for Nanking

Nanking has received numerous positive reviews, including one from Reuters that says that the "beautifully crafted film...honors the highest calling of documentary filmmaking." It was accepted to the Sundance Film Festival in January, 2007 and nominated for the Grand Jury Prize (Documentary); the film was awarded honors for Documentary Editing. In 2008, this documentary was awarded the Peabody Award. Japanese right-wing nationalist filmmaker Satoru Mizushima called the film a "setup by China to control intelligence," and plans to release his own documentary, The Truth about Nanjing, in which the massacre is portrayed as merely political propaganda. On his blog, Nanking producer Ted Leonsis responded by saying: "Our film isn't an anti-Japanese film. It is an anti-war film."

In July 2007, the film premiered in Beijing and opened in China.

On November 19, 2007, Nanking was named by the Academy of Motion Picture Arts and Sciences as one of 15 films on its documentary feature Oscar shortlist. It was not retained when the list was narrowed to the final five nominations. Guttentag, Sturman, and Bentley received a nomination for the Writers Guild of America Award for Best Documentary Screenplay.

== See also ==
- City of Life and Death
- Don't Cry, Nanking
- Japanese war crimes
- John Rabe (film)
- Nanjing Massacre films
- Prince Yasuhiko Asaka
- Shiro Azuma
- The Truth about Nanjing
- The Tokyo Trial
