= Don't Cry, Nanking =

1995 Chinese film

- Film poster
- Traditional Chinese: 南京１９３７
- Simplified Chinese: 南京１９３７
- Hanyu Pinyin: Nánjīng yī jiǔ sān qī
- Directed by: Wu Ziniu
- Written by: Jesse Hung; Liang Xiaosheng; Xu Tiansheng
- Produced by: Wang Ying-Hsiang; John Woo
- Starring: Chin Han; Rene Liu; Cho Yuet
- Cinematography: Yang Shu; Wang Xili
- Edited by: He Wenzhang
- Music by: Tan Dun
- Production company: Long Shong Pictures
- Release date: September 14, 1995 (Hong Kong)
- Running time: 110 minutes
- Country: China
- Languages: Mandarin; Japanese

Don't Cry, Nanking, also known as Nanjing 1937 (Chinese: 南京１９３７; pinyin: Nánjīng yī jiǔ sān qī), is a 1995 Chinese war film about the 1937 Nanjing Massacre committed by the Imperial Japanese Army in the former capital city Nanjing, China.

== Plot ==
Set in late December 1937, the story focuses on a family, a Chinese doctor, Cheng Xian, and his pregnant Japanese wife and their two children, Haruko/Chunzi and Xiao Ling who escaped the Battle of Shanghai hoping to seek refuge in the capital where the doctor was born. Being Japanese, the wife, Nakayama Rieko must hide her origins to the Chinese citizens, but soon upon their arrival, the city is invaded by the Imperial Japanese Army. Cheng Xian asked his relative Li Gen-fa to find shelter for his family but Gen-fa warned that his wife's nationality would bring troubles for them. Cheng Xian also meet a local teacher, Lin Shuqin and ask her to teach his young son.

In the desperate battle outside the city, the local garrison attempted to halt the Japanese advance. A soldier named Deng Tianyuan, Lin Shuqin love interest, deliver a message to the local division commander, however he was cut short by an injured officers which tells them the battle has lost, and the division commander tell his subordinate to lead his men and continue to fight to death before committing suicide. In the meantime, a Chinese general, Tang asking German diplomat about the military equipment that was purchased and supposed to be delivered to them however the German diplomat replied that the Führer has ordered to halt further shipment to China. Lin Shuqin tries to convince the grandfather of one of her students Xiao Zhenzhen, who is also an elderly scholar from Qing era, to flees the city but he refuses, stressing out that the city was the important capital of China for centuries and dismissed the Japanese military as a nothing more than mere pirates. Soon the city has fallen to the Japanese military, and the Chinese garrison surrendered, of which the surrendered soldiers were later massacred en masse. The Japanese military now begins their reign of terror and death upon the ruined city and its inhabitants. Li Gen-fa was later killed by the Japanese army for refusing to cooperate with the Japanese, while the elderly scholar was killed by Japanese soldiers during a looting while his butler were killed by a pair of Japanese officers as part of "contest to kill hundreds using swords".

This time, it is Cheng Xian who tries to hide his identity as the family tries to reach the safety zone established by the International Committee for Nanking Safety Zone. Due to Rieko's origin, she was spared by Japanese patrols while Cheng Xian are forcefully taken away and were forced to work for the Japanese before being freed by a sympathetic Taiwanese Japanese soldier. While at refugee camp, Rieko panicking and asking for help from a foreign refugee camp administrator to save her husband and inadvertently speak Japanese and was nearly lynched by the crowd until Lin intervened and saved them by saying she was pregnant and was different than the Japanese "savages" outside of the camp.

The Japanese soldiers attempted to enters the camps numerous time however they were rebuffed by the foreigners in charge of the refugee camps. Nevertheless at night, the Japanese again attempted to enter the camp forcefully and managed to break in and began their rampages and sexual assaults against the refugees. Few Japanese soldiers attacked the shelter of the Rieko's family and knocked Cheng Xian out, and attempted to rape Haruko before Rieko yells at the soldiers in Japanese that her daughter is Japanese citizen, which they immediately stop and left the place. Unfortunately, Lin Shuqin were caught by the soldiers in her teaching place and were raped, all while the young student trying to stop the soldiers from abusing their teacher. Deng Tianyuan, now disguised as clean-up worker, discovered Lin Shuqin in dire condition after being abused by the Japanese soldiers. Rieko later gave birth to a baby boy and named him "Nanjing" in honor of the city he was born in, and Cheng Xian asked Deng to bring his children and his newborn son to safety while he would take care of his sickly wife in the camp. Deng later smuggled out Lin and her young student and Cheng Xian's children out of city thanks to a local Red Cross workers and fled through boat.

In the closing epilogue, the death count of the massacres was shown and stated that after eight years of war of resistance, Japan announced its unconditional surrender on August 15, 1945, and the perpetrator of the massacre were prosecuted and executed for their crimes.

== Cast ==
- Chin Han - Cheng Xian
- Ai Saotome - Rieko
- Shi Xiaoyan - Haruko/Chunzi
- Wang Xibei - Xiao Ling
- Tao Zeru - Li Gen-fa
- Chen Yida - Deng Tianyuan
- Jung Zhi Jun - the elderly scholar
- Rene Liu - Lin Shu Qin
- Cho Yuet - Lui Oi
- Gao Zhenpeng as the butler
- Kong Weijia as Xiao Zhenzhen
- Guan Cunhao as Tang Shengzhi
- Zhang Jiatai as the teacher
- Lin Shengguo as Mikami
- Keisaburo Kubo as IJA general Iwane Matsui
- Jiang Guobin as Shi Song (Taiwanese soldier)
- Zuo Xiaohu as Kondo
- Wang Xingkang as the old rickshaw driver
- Ulrich Ottenburger - John Rabe
- Michael Zannett - John Magee
- Rebecca Peyrelon - missionary Minnie Vautrin

== Trivia ==
Among historical characters such as John Rabe and Minnie Vautrin, the film also features the infamous hundred man killing contest between Toshiaki Mukai and Tsuyochi Noda.

Being produced before the publishing of such books like Iris Chang's The Rape of Nanking and Herbert Bix's Hirohito and the Making of Modern Japan, the movie shows General Iwane Matsui giving the order to "kill all the captives" and omits any reference to Prince Asaka.

== Reception ==
Upon its release in 1995, the movie grossed HK$2,102,915 in Hong Kong. The film was not released in Japan until December 1997, nearly two years after its completion.

== See also ==
- Nanking (film)
- Black Sun: The Nanking Massacre
- Japanese war crimes
- The Tokyo Trial (film)
