= City of Life and Death =

2009 Chinese war film by Lu Chuan

- Film poster

Chinese name
- Traditional Chinese: 南京!南京!
- Simplified Chinese: 南京!南京!
Transcriptions
Standard Mandarin
- Hanyu Pinyin: Nánjīng! Nánjīng!
- Directed by: Lu Chuan
- Written by: Lu Chuan
- Produced by: Zhao Haicheng; Yang Xinli; Han Xiaoli; Jiang Tao; Liang Yong
- Starring: Liu Ye; Gao Yuanyuan; Fan Wei; Qin Lan; Nakaizumi Hideo; Jiang Yiyan; Yao Di; John Paisley
- Cinematography: Cao Yu; He Lei
- Edited by: Teng Yu
- Music by: Liu Tong
- Production companies: Media Asia Entertainment Group; China Film Group; Stellar Megamedia Group; Jiangsu Broadcasting System; Chuan Production Film Studio
- Distributed by: Media Asia Distribution Ltd. China Film Group
- Release date: April 22, 2009
- Running time: 133 minutes
- Country: China
- Languages: Mandarin; English; German; Japanese
- Budget: US$12 million

City of Life and Death is a 2009 Chinese historical war drama film written and directed by Lu Chuan, marking his third feature film. The film deals with the Battle of Nanjing and the following massacre committed by the Japanese army during the Second Sino-Japanese War. The film is also known as Nanking! Nanking! or Nanjing! Nanjing!. The film was released in China on April 22, 2009, and became a major box office success in the country, earning CN¥150 million (approximately US$20 million) in its first two and a half weeks alone.

== Plot ==
City of Life and Death is set in 1937. The Imperial Japanese Army has just captured Nanjing, capital of the Republic of China. What followed is historically known as the Nanjing Massacre, a period of several weeks wherein massive numbers of Chinese prisoners-of-war and civilians were killed by the Japanese military.

After some commanders of the National Revolutionary Army flee Nanjing, a Chinese soldier Lieutenant Lu Jianxiong and his comrade-in-arms Shunzi attempt to stop a group of deserting troops from leaving the city, but as they exit the gates, they are captured by Japanese forces that have surrounded the city.

As the Japanese comb the city for enemy forces, Superior Private (later Sergeant) Kadokawa Masao and his men are attacked by Lu Jianxiong and a small unit of both regular and non-regular soldiers, who fire at them from buildings. Lu and his companions are eventually forced to surrender as more Japanese troops arrive. The Chinese prisoners-of-war are systematically escorted to various locations to be executed en masse. Shunzi and a boy called Xiaodouzi survive the shootings and they flee to the Nanjing Safety Zone, run by the German businessman and Nazi Party member John Rabe and other Westerners. Thousands of Chinese women, children, elderly men and wounded soldiers take refuge in this safety zone. However, the zone is forcefully entered several times by bands of Japanese soldiers intent on making sexual advances on female refugees. Due to the repeated intrusions, the women are urged to cut their hair and dress like men to protect themselves from being raped. A prostitute called Xiaojiang refuses to do so, saying that she needs to keep her hair to earn a living.

Meanwhile, Kadokawa develops feelings for a Japanese prostitute named Yuriko and struggles to come to terms with the omnipresent violence around him with his own conflicting impulses. Despite his feelings of alienation, Kadokawa brings Yuriko candy and gifts from Japan, and promises to marry her after the war.

Rabe's secretary Tang Tianxiang and a teacher named Jiang Shuyun manage the daily operations of the safety zone. Even though he is in a privileged position, Tang is still unable to protect his young daughter from being thrown out of a window by a Japanese soldier, and his sister-in-law from being raped. When the Japanese officer Second Lieutenant Ida Osamu demands that the refugees provide 100 women to serve as "comfort women", Rabe and Jiang tearfully make the announcement to the community. Xiaojiang and others volunteer themselves, hoping that their sacrifice will save the refugees.

Kadokawa meets Xiaojiang and brings her rice but witnesses another soldier raping her as she lies almost lifeless. Later, many "comfort women", including Xiaojiang, die from the abuse, and Kadokawa sees their naked bodies being taken away. Kadokawa feels further estranged when he witnesses Ida shooting Tang's sister-in-law May, who has become insane.

Rabe receives an order to return to Germany because his activities in the safety zone are detrimental to diplomatic ties between his country and Japan. Tang and his wife are allowed to leave Nanjing with Rabe. However Tang changes his mind at the last moment and trades places with a Chinese soldier pretending to be Rabe's assistant, saying that he wants to stay behind to find May. Mrs Tang reveals that she is pregnant before bidding her husband farewell. Not long after Rabe has left, Ida has Tang executed by firing squad.

The Japanese disband the safety zone and start hunting for Chinese men who were previously soldiers, promising that these men would find work and receive pay if they turn themselves in. However, men deemed to be soldiers are huddled into trucks and sent for execution. Shunzi, who survived the earlier mass killings, is physically checked and initially deemed to be a non-combatant, but is later recognised by a Japanese soldier and brought onto a truck as well.

After Minnie Vautrin and other Westerners plead with the Japanese, Ida permits each refugee to choose only one man from the trucks to be saved. Jiang Shuyun rescues a man, pretending to be his wife, and then returns for Shunzi, claiming that he is her husband, while Xiaodouzi acts as their son. Kadokawa sees through Jiang's ruse but does not expose her. Despite this, another Japanese soldier points her out to Ida and the three of them are captured. Shunzi is taken away again, this time together with Xiaodouzi. Jiang, knowing that she will be raped, asks Kadokawa to kill her. He grants her her wish and shoots her, much to his comrades' surprise.

Afterwards, Kadokawa looks for Yuriko and learns that she has died after leaving Nanjing. He says that she was his wife and requests that she be given a proper funeral. As the Japanese perform a dance-ritual to celebrate their conquest of Nanjing and honour their war dead, Kadokawa reveals his emotional turmoil over what he has done and witnessed.

Kadokawa and another Japanese soldier march Shunzi and Xiaodouzi out of town to be executed, but to their surprise, Kadokawa releases them instead. Kadokawa tells the other soldier, "Life is more difficult than death." The soldier bows to show his respect for Kadokawa's decision and walks away. Kadokawa then weeps before shooting himself to escape from his guilt.

In the end credits, it is revealed that Mrs Tang lived into old age, as did Ida Osamu, and that Xiaodouzi is still alive today.

== Cast ==
- Liu Ye as Lu Jianxiong
- Gao Yuanyuan as Jiang Shuyun
- Fan Wei as Tang Tianxiang (Mr. Tang)
- Qin Lan as Madam Zhou (Mrs. Tang)
- Nakaizumi Hideo as Kadokawa Masao
- Jiang Yiyan as Jiang Xiangjun (Xiaojiang)
- Yao Di as Zhou Xiaomei (May)
- John Paisley as John Rabe
- Kohata Ryu as Ida Osamu
- Zhao Yisui as Shunzi
- Liu Bin as Xiaodouzi
- Miyamoto Yuko as Yuriko
- Beverly Peckous as Minnie Vautrin
- Sam Voutas as Durdin
- Aisling Dunne as Grace the missionary
- Kajioka Junichi as Mr. Tomita
- Liu Jinling
- Zhao Zhenhua

== Production ==
Filming began in Tianjin in October 2007, working under a budget of 80 million yuan (US$12 million), and was produced by the China Film Group, Stella Megamedia Group, Media Asia Entertainment Group and Jiangsu Broadcasting System.

The film endured a lengthy period undergoing analysis by Chinese censors, waiting six months for script approval, and another six months for approval of the finished film. It was finally approved for release on April 22, 2009. However, the Film Bureau did require some minor edits and cuts, including the removal of scenes depicting Japanese officer beheading a prisoner, a scene of a woman being tied down before being raped, and an interrogation scene of a Chinese soldier and a Japanese commander.

== Release ==
City of Life and Death was released on 535 film prints and 700 digital screens on April 22 grossing an estimated US$10.2 million (70 million yuan) in its first five days. This made it the second biggest opener in 2009, after the second part of Red Cliff, which opened with US$14.86 million (101.5 million yuan) in its first four days of release. The film is also the highest new box office record for director Lu Chuan, whose second feature film Kekexili: Mountain Patrol grossed US$1.26 million (8.6 million yuan) in 2004.

The film received a limited U.S. release in May 2011.

Despite its success, City of Life and Death created controversy upon its release in mainland China. In particular, some criticised the film's sympathetic portrayal of the Japanese soldier Kadokawa. The film was nearly pulled from theaters, and Lu even received online death threats to both himself and his family.

== Awards ==
The film won the top Golden Shell prize at the 2009 San Sebastian Film Festival and also won the Best Cinematography prize. At the 2009 Asia Pacific Screen Awards, the film won Achievement in Directing (Lu Chuan) and Achievement in Cinematography (Cao Yu). The film also won Best Director (Lu Chuan) and Best Cinematographer (Cao Yu) Awards at the 4th Asian Film Awards in 2010. The film won Best Cinematography (Cao Yu) at the 46th Golden Horse Film Awards and was nominated for Best Visual Effects. At the Oslo Film Festival in 2009, the film also won the Best Film Prize. At the 2011 Los Angeles Film Critics Association Awards, the film won Best Foreign-Language Film.

== Critical reception ==
City of Life and Death has received extremely positive reviews. The film received a 93% approval rating from critics based on 54 reviews on the aggregator site Rotten Tomatoes, with an average score of 8.4/10. Metacritic, which uses a weighted average, assigned the film a score of 85 out of 100, based on 13 critics, indicating "universal acclaim".

Kate Muir of The Times gave the film five out of five stars, describes the film as "harrowing, shocking and searingly emotional", and states "the picture has the grandeur of a classic. It should be witnessed." Derek Elley of Variety states "at times semi-impressionistic, at others gut-wrenchingly up close and personal, Nanjing massacre chronicle City of Life and Death lives up to hype and expectations." Maggie Lee of The Hollywood Reporter states the film is "Potently cinematic and full of personal stylistic bravura."

Betsy Sharkey of the Los Angeles Times describes the film as "Truly a masterpiece in black and white and pain" and the film contains "some of the most affectingly choreographed battle scenes to be found, with Lu Chuan a master at moving from the micro of a face to the macro of a city in ruins." Karina Longworth of IndieWire describe the film "manages to convey the total horror of the Japanese atrocities from the perspective of both perpetrators and victims, all with exceptional nuance, sensitivity and sadness" and the film "has the feel of a lost post-War foreign classic, a masterwork implicating the viewer in the horrors of bearing witness."

Michael O'Sullivan at The Washington Post gave it three out of four stars, elucidating it as "...a muscular, physical movie, pieced together from arresting imagery and revelatory gestures, large and small."

== See also ==
- Black Sun: The Nanking Massacre
- Don't Cry, Nanking
- John Rabe
- Nanking
