= Robert O. Wilson =

American physician (1906–1967)

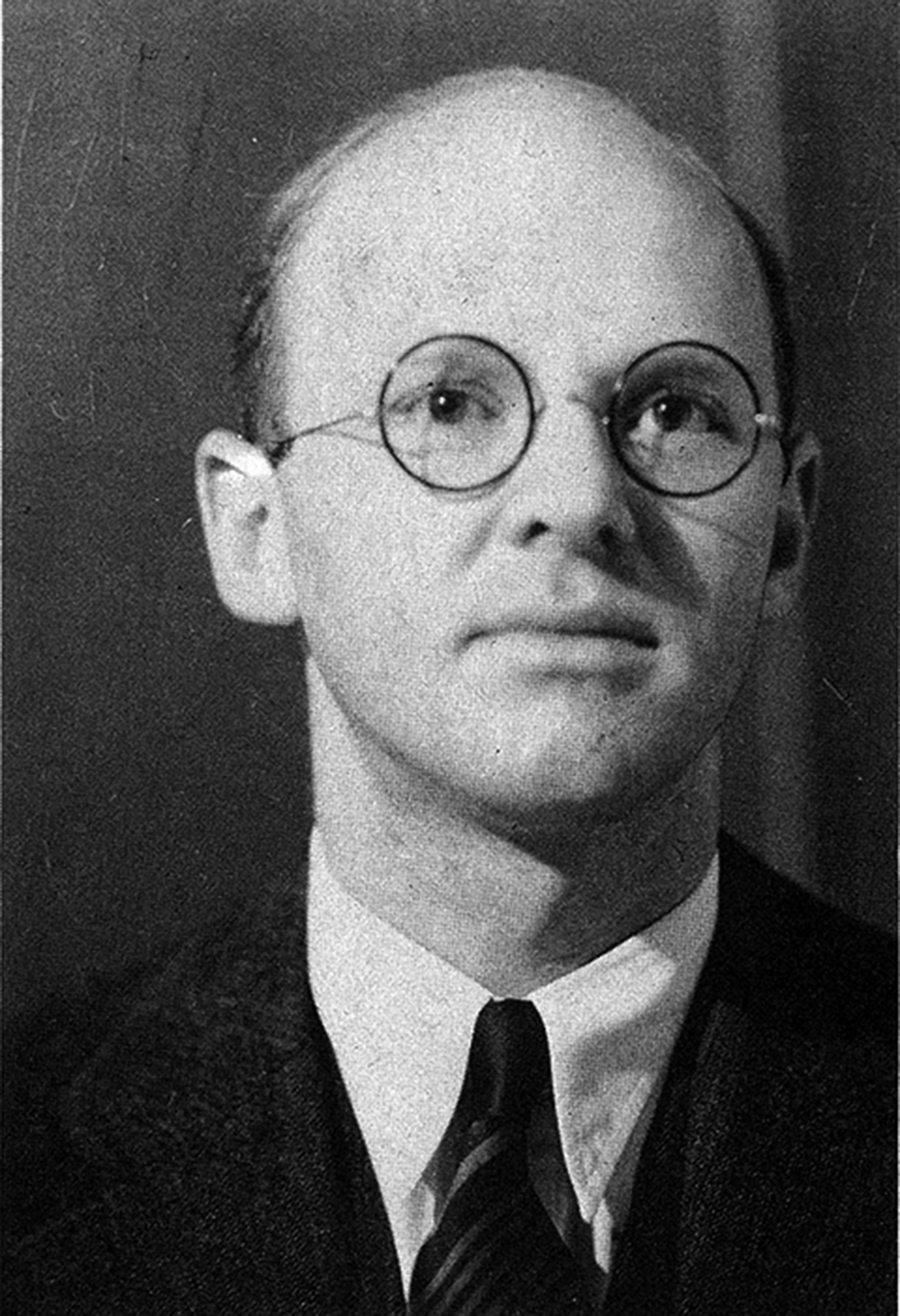
- Robert O. Wilson
- Born: October 5, 1904; Nanking, Qing dynasty
- Died: November 16, 1967 (aged 63); Arcadia, California, U.S
- Citizenship: American
- Education: Princeton University; Harvard Medical School
- Occupation: Physician
- Medical career
- Institutions: University of Nanking

Robert O. Wilson (October 5, 1904 – November 16, 1967) was an American physician. Amidst the chaos and bloodshed that followed in the months leading up to the Japanese occupation of Nanjing, Wilson worked tirelessly at his post, eventually becoming one among only a handful of physicians who had not left the city by 1937.

== Early life ==
Born on October 5, 1904 to Protestant missionaries Wilbur F. Wilson and Mary Rowley Wilson in Nanjing, Qing dynasty. Wilson attended Princeton University and subsequently obtained his medical training at Harvard Medical School, graduating in 1929. He returned to Nanjing in 1936, where he assumed a housestaff position at Drum Tower Hospital of University of Nanking.

== Nanjing Massacre ==
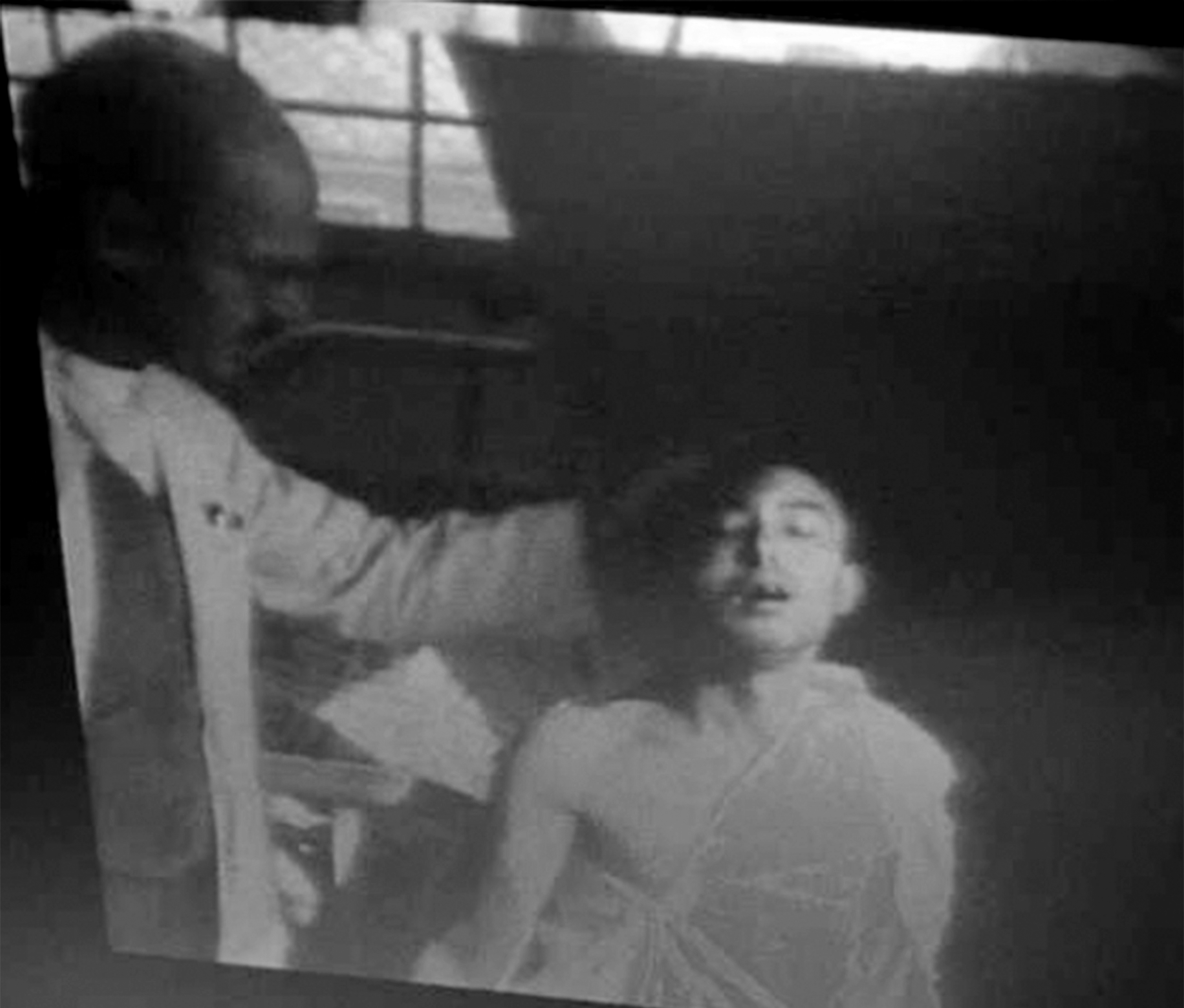
Dr. Wilson caring for wounded Chinese citizen in 1937

During the Nanjing Massacre, Wilson was the main surgeon responsible for treating the victims of the ongoing atrocities (although several nurses were still available) and, along with John Rabe and Minnie Vautrin, was instrumental in the establishment of the Nanking Safety Zone, which sheltered more than 200,000 people within its confined walls. During that time, the selfless work of Wilson and his associates saved the lives of countless civilians and POW's who would have otherwise perished at the hands of the Japanese. He worked tirelessly on the victims despite there being a shortage of both water and electricity. As a result, he was bestowed the Order of Brilliant Jade, Sixth Class by the Republic of China government in 1938. He returned to United States and settled down there in 1940.

== Testimony before the International Military Tribunal for the Far East ==
After the surrender of Japan, Wilson testified before the International Military Tribunal for the Far East about the atrocities that he had witnessed during the massacre. A collection of diary entries kept by Wilson during his tenure at Nanjing Hospital were later released and offers a grim look into the stark reality that was Nanjing at the time of the atrocities:

The slaughter of civilians is appalling. I could go on for pages telling of cases of rape and brutality almost beyond belief. Two bayoneted corpses are the only survivors of seven street cleaners who were sitting in their headquarters when Japanese soldiers came in without warning or reason and killed five of their number and wounded the two that found their way to the hospital.

Let me recount some instances occurring in the last two days. Last night the house of one of the Chinese staff members of the university was broken into and two of the women, his relatives, were raped. Two girls, about 16, were raped to death in one of the refugee camps. In the University Middle School where there are 8,000 people the Japs came in ten times last night, over the wall, stole food, clothing, and raped until they were satisfied. They bayoneted one little boy of eight who have [sic] five bayonet wounds including one that penetrated his stomach, a portion of omentum was outside the abdomen. I think he will live.

== Later life and death ==
Wilson was married and had three children, Elizabeth, Marjorie, and Robert O. Wilson, Jr. He died in Arcadia, California on November 16, 1967.

His monument was unveiled in a ceremony at the United Methodist Church in Arcadia, California on November 12, 2017.

== See also ==
Wilson is portrayed by Woody Harrelson in the 2007 documentary film, Nanking, and by Steve Buscemi in the 2009 film, John Rabe.
