= Minnie Vautrin =

American missionary in China (1886–1941)

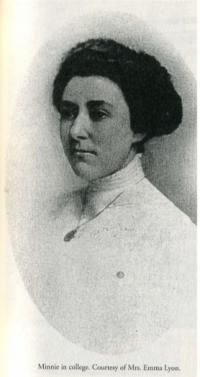
- Photograph of American missionary Wilhelmina "Minnie" Vautrin in 1912
- Born: Wilhelmina Vautrin; September 27, 1886; Secor, Illinois, U.S.
- Died: May 14, 1941 (aged 54); Indianapolis, Indiana, U.S.
- Resting place: Salt River Cemetery, Shepherd, Michigan, U.S.
- Education: University of Illinois Urbana-Champaign; Columbia University; Illinois State University
- Occupation: missionary
- Employer(s): Foreign Christian Missionary Society; Ginling College

Wilhelmina "Minnie" Vautrin (September 27, 1886 – May 14, 1941) was an American missionary, diarist, educator and president of Ginling College. A Christian missionary in China for 28 years, she became known for caring for and protecting at least 10,000 Chinese refugees during the Nanjing Massacre in China, during which she kept a now-published diary, at times even challenging the Japanese authorities for documents in an attempt to protect the civilians staying at her college.

After surviving in the Nanking Safety Zone from 1937, she returned to the United States in May 1940. One year later, she died by suicide in America due to extreme stress and trauma from the Nanjing Massacre. Vautrin was awarded the Order of the Blue Jade by the Chinese government for her humanitarian work during the Nanjing Massacre.

== Early life and education ==
Wilhelmina Vautrin was born in Secor, Clayton Township, Illinois, on September 27, 1886, to Pauline (née Lohr) and Edmond Louis Vautrin. Her father Edmond, who considered himself French, immigrated from the often-contested Lorraine region to the United States. He arrived in Clayton County, Illinois, in 1883 to undergo a blacksmithing apprenticeship with his uncle in Peoria, and later moved to nearby Secor, where he married Pauline. Minnie was the second of the couple's three children; her elder brother died as an infant.

When Minnie was six years old, her mother died of unrecorded causes. After this, Minnie was sent to several different foster homes. Three years later, the courts permitted her to return home to her father, where she assumed many household chores as well as excelled in school. A teacher later remembered Vautrin, commenting that "Minnie was a born student...She could excel in most anything she tried, and was a genuinely Christian girl." After primary school, Vautrin attended Secor High School. During that time, Vautrin worked several part-time jobs to save for further schooling, as well as volunteered at local churches.

Vautrin was accepted to Illinois State Normal University in Normal, Illinois in 1903. Her limited finances meant Vautrin had to work, and delayed her studies several times. She nonetheless graduated in 1907, ranked first in her class of 93 students and delivered a speech at the commencement. She taught mathematics at LeRoy High School, Illinois, before continuing her studies at the University of Illinois. At that university, Vautrin was president of the Student Volunteer Movement for Foreign Missions. She graduated in 1912 as salutatorian of her class with an A.B. in Science.

== Missionary career ==
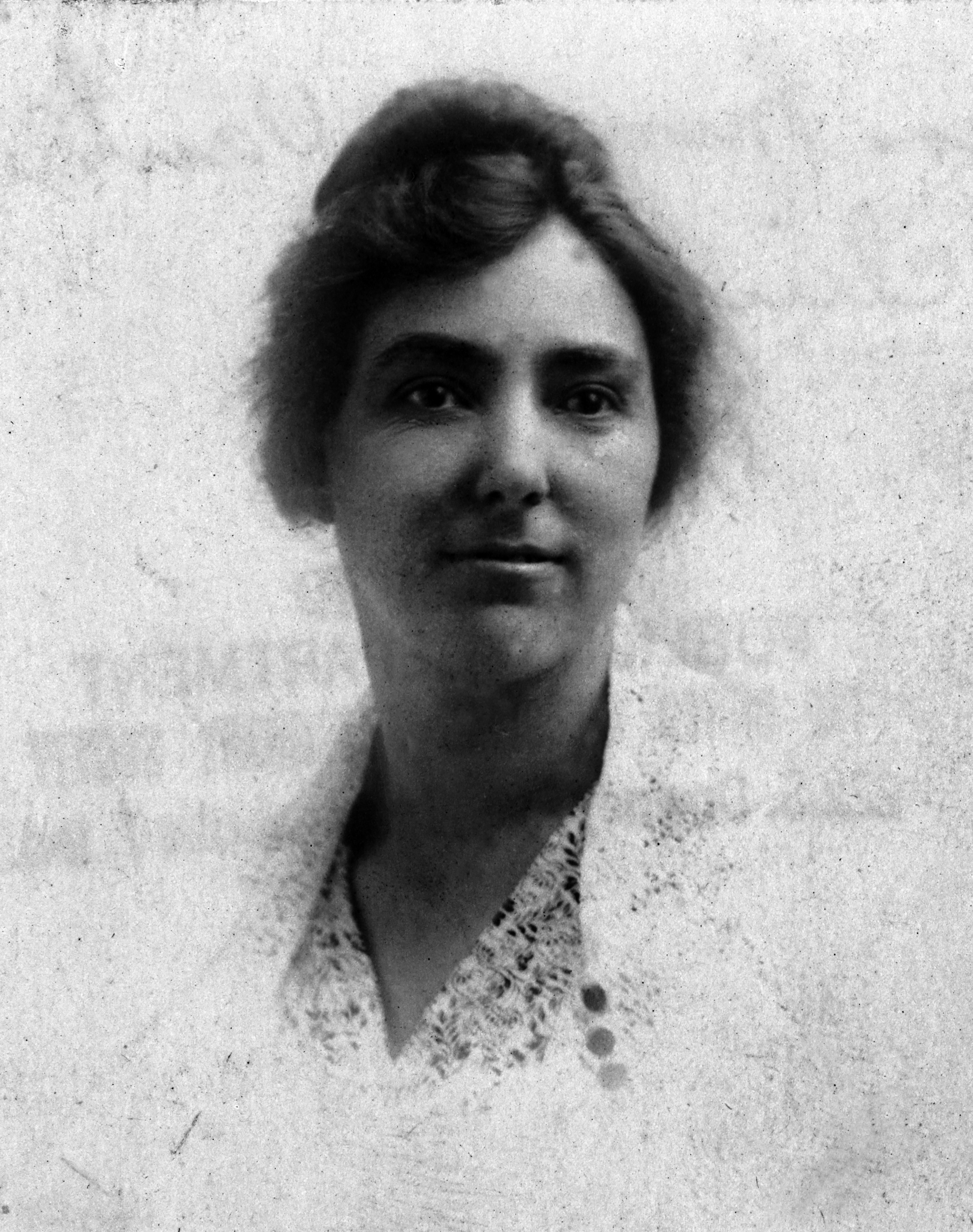
Minnie Vautrin before 1938

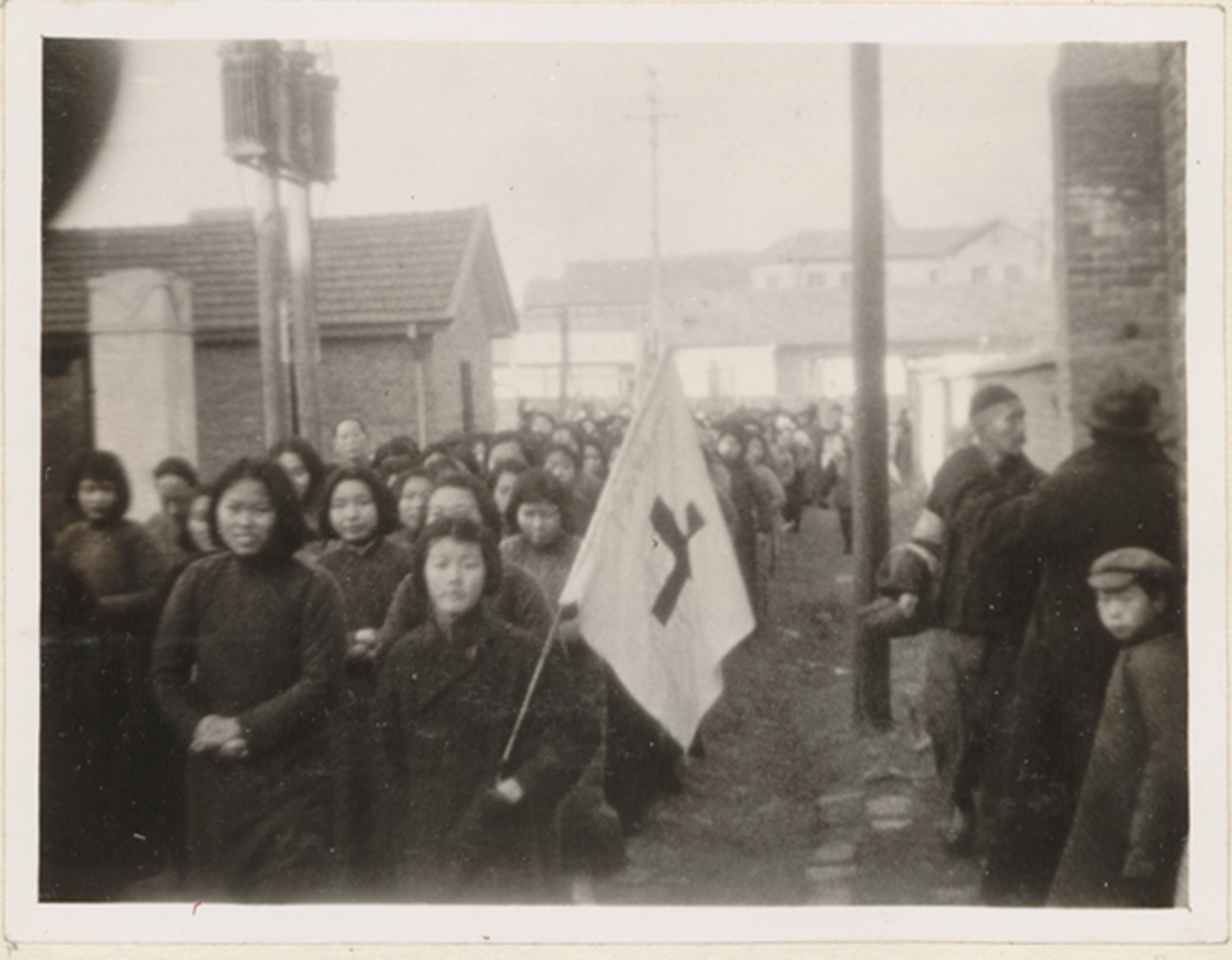
Minnie Vautrin helped the refugees in 1937

The university pastor recommended Vautrin to the recruiters of the Foreign Christian Missionary Society, who requested that she replace a teacher in China. Iris Chang, writer of The Rape of Nanking, notes that Vautrin was "Tall and Handsome in her youth, with long dark hair, she was a vivacious and popular woman who attracted numerous suitors," but who decided that instead of getting married she would become a missionary.

When Vautrin received this request in 1912, Christian missions to China, facilitated by groups such as the Foreign Christian Missionary Society, had begun to flourish as a result of the treaties ending the First Opium War (1840–1842) and Second Opium War (1863–1865) that opened Chinese seaports to Christianity. Hua-ling Hu, one of Vautrin's biographers and writer of American Goddess at the Rape of Nanking: The Courage of Minnie Vautrin, writes that "by 1914, about six thousand young Americans went to foreign countries as missionaries, over one-third of them to China." Vautrin accepted the Foreign Christian Missionary Society's request to develop a girls' school in China, and when she was 26 years old, she traveled to Hefei to establish the San Ching Girls' Middle School. During her time at the school the number of pupils increased and a high school department was added. In Hefei, Vautrin also met her future fiancé, a fellow American missionary whose name is unknown.

In 1918, after serving for a period of six years in China, Minnie returned to the United States for furlough. She enrolled in Columbia University in New York City to pursue a Master's degree in Education, which she received in 1919. While at Columbia University, Vautrin was approached by a teacher from Ginling College, and was asked to serve as president of the institution for one year. The college was the third institution founded by a group of American missionaries who sought to "establish four woman's colleges in China—one each in north, central, west, and south." Vautrin postponed her wedding for one year in order to become the acting president at Ginling College in 1919. However, she later broke off her engagement and never married.

At Ginling College, Vautrin decided to extend her one-year agreement. She created courses on education administration and management, an innovative student-teaching program, and handled the planning and funding of the new campus by the West Gate of Nanjing. During the fall semester of 1922, Vautrin hosted a fundraiser to build an elementary school for 150 local, mostly illiterate children who lived in the homes near Ginling College's campus. The biographer Hua-ling Hu writes that, while at Ginling College, Minnie "attempted to lead the students to fulfill the spirit of Ginling's motto, 'abundant life,' by making them walk out of the 'ivory tower' to see and understand the suffering of the poor and by encouraging them to devote their lives for the betterment of the society." However, some of the college's staff members and students did not support Vautrin's methods and found her overbearing, conservative, and self-righteous. This may be due to her "watchful and interfering administrative style."

In 1926, after Vautrin returned from a brief visit to her family in America, the Chinese Nationalist government's Northern Expedition troops under General Chiang Kai-shek captured Nanjing. While in Nanjing, the army perpetrated the Nanking Incident, which involved the destruction and looting of the city and the slaughter of native citizens as well as foreigners. Ginling College was not harmed during the looting, and Vautrin hid in the college's attic with a few others while Chiang Kai-shek's troops were on Ginling's campus. The Nanking Incident deterred many American missionaries from serving in China, and many left the country.

However, Vautrin remained at Ginling College and served as its president until the Nationalist government mandated that all colleges in China have native-born presidents. She was replaced by a Ginling graduate, Dr. Wu Yi-fang, in September 1928. In 1931, Vautrin returned to the United States on furlough and to care for her aging father. She returned to Ginling in 1932.

Upon hearing of the Marco Polo Bridge Incident in 1937, Vautrin cancelled her planned furlough, scheduled for 1938, and immediately returned to Nanjing from Tokyo in order to protect Ginling College and its students. Vautrin prepared intensely for the approaching Imperial Japanese army. She made arrangements to prepare the campus by sending records to Shanghai, purchasing supplies, instructing students and faculty on emergency precautions, cleaning out and converting rooms in campus buildings for storage and refuge, and ordering the building of trenches. The first Japanese air raid on Nanjing took place on August 15, 1937. As a result of the raid, the American embassy arranged for the evacuation of Americans from the city. In her diary, Vautrin wrote that she felt compelled to stay in Nanjing:

I personally feel that I cannot leave... Men are not asked to leave their ships when they are in danger and women are not asked to leave their children.

By September, only three Ginling students remained on campus. Due to financial strains, the salaries of the fifteen remaining faculty members at Ginling College were halved. Anticipating a direct Japanese assault on the city, the foreigners who chose to stay in Nanjing organized the International Committee for the Nanking Safety Zone (ICNSZ) on November 15, 1937. The committee requested that the Japanese and Chinese governments treat the refugee zone of Nanjing as neutral, and both nations agreed and granted the ICNSZ neutrality. The Japanese placed one condition on the neutrality, requiring that the neutral zone would be made void if Chinese military personnel were found hiding within it.

In the first few nights of the Japanese attack on the city, 850 refugees came to Ginling College, which was designated as one of the twenty-five refugee camps in Nanjing. When the Imperial Japanese Army took complete control of Nanjing in December 1937, she and other foreign nationals—including John Rabe—worked to protect civilians in the Nanking Safety Zone. Ginling College took up its full role as a refugee haven, at times harboring up to 10,000 women in buildings designed to support between 200 and 300. During this period, Vautrin wrote fairly frequently in her diary. One of her entries was a prayer:

Oh, God, control the cruel beastliness of the soldiers in Nanking tonight, comfort the heartbroken mothers and fathers whose innocent sons have been shot today, and guard the young women and girls through the long agonizing hours of this night. Speed the day when wars shall be no more. When thy Kingdom will come, Thy will be done on earth as it is in heaven.

When all other refugee camps closed on February 4, 1938, a large number of women and children again sought refuge at the college, and a census in mid-March showed 3,310 refugees were resident there. Vautrin would patrol the campus grounds and repel incursions of Japanese soldiers into the college and rescue and care for refugees. She saw to the burial of the dead and the reception of newborn babies and was successful in tracing missing husbands and sons. Industrial or crafts classes were provided for women who had lost their husbands, so that they might support themselves. One hundred women graduated under this program.

Vautrin recounted the war in her diary in 1937:

There probably is no crime that has not been committed in this city today. Thirty girls were taken from language school last night, and today I have heard scores of heartbreaking stories of girls who were taken from their homes last night—one of the girls was but 12 years old. Food, bedding and money have been taken from people. ... I suspect every house in the city has been opened, again and yet again, and robbed. Tonight a truck passed in which there were eight or ten girls, and as it passed they called out "救命!救命! Jiuming! Jiuming!"—save our lives. The occasional shots that we hear out on the hills, or on the street, make us realize the sad fate of some man—very probably not a soldier.

On 19 December:

In my wrath, I wished I had the power to smite them for their dastardly work. How ashamed women of Japan would be if they knew these tales of horror.

In 1938, she wrote in her diary that she had to go to the Japanese embassy repeatedly from December 18 to January 13 to get proclamations to prohibit Japanese soldiers from committing crimes at Ginling because the soldiers tore the documents up before taking women away. Near the end of her service at Ginling College, Vautrin wrote several entries that lacked her previous determination and optimism. Among these was April 14, 1940:

I'm about at the end of my energy. Can no longer forge ahead and make plans for the work, for on every hand there seems to be obstacles of some kind.

In the spring of 1940, suffering from severe stress probably due to worry about the fate of Ginling College and its students, Vautrin was accompanied back to the United States by a colleague. After attempting suicide using sleeping pills, Vautrin appeared to recover for a short while. However, she later died by suicide by turning on the gas stove in her apartment in Indianapolis. She was 54 years old. One entry in her journal, recorded shortly before her death, displays her devotion to Ginling College and the people of China, whom she served for 28 years as a Christian missionary:

Had I ten perfect lives, I would give them all to China.

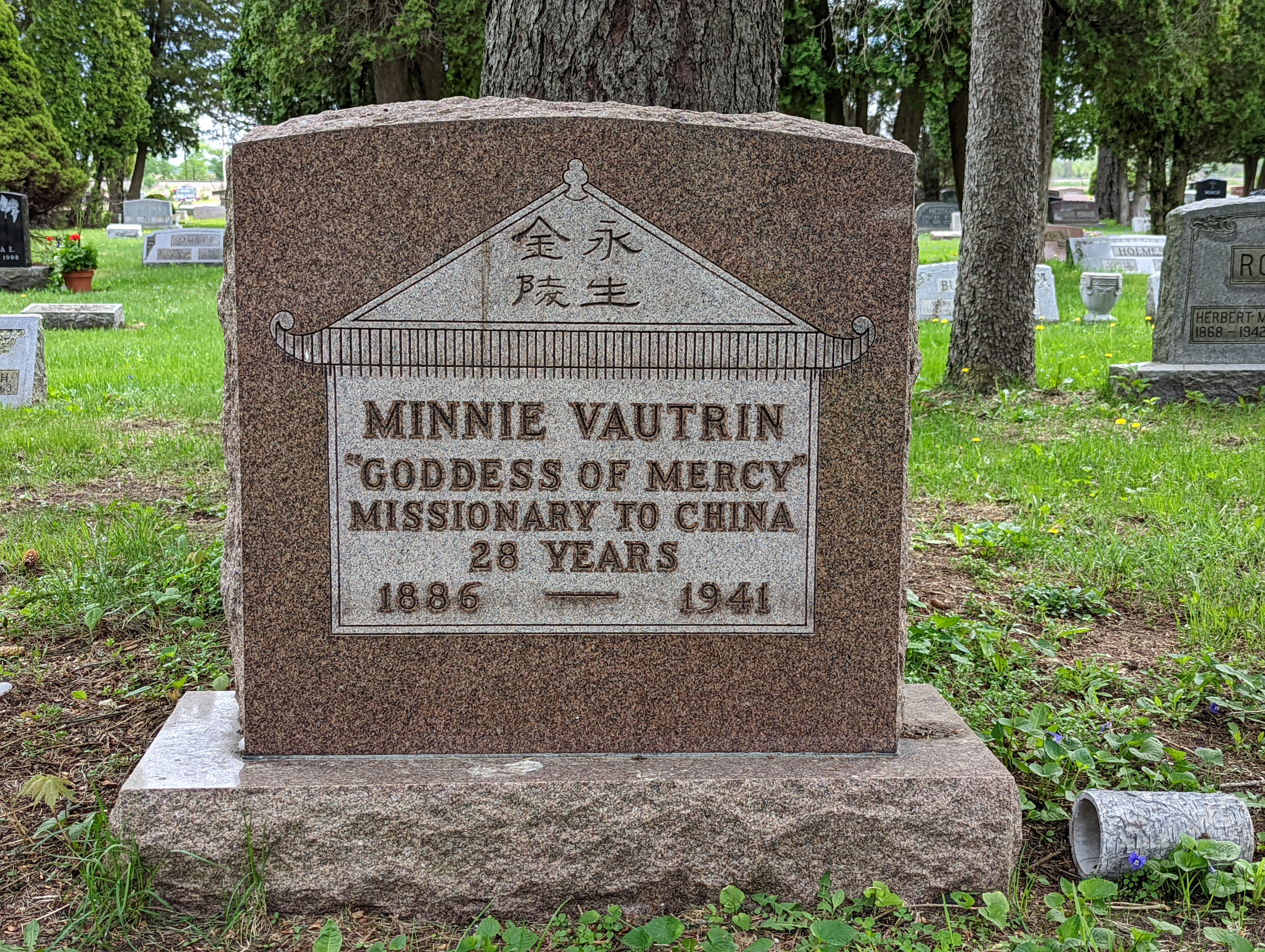
Vautrin's gravestone

== Legacy ==
Vautrin was awarded the Order of Brilliant Jade on July 30, 1938, by the Chinese government for her sacrifices during the Nanjing Massacre. Her work saving the lives of Chinese civilians during the massacre is recounted in the biographical book, American Goddess at the Rape of Nanking, written by historian Hua-Ling Hu. In the 2007 documentary film Nanking, Vautrin was portrayed by actress Mariel Hemingway, who recited excerpts from Vautrin's diary.

The Nanjing Massacre Memorial Hall is a museum built by the Nanjing Municipal Government to memorialize the 300,000 victims of the Nanjing massacre, the survivors, and those who tried to protect the people of Nanjing during the atrocity. In the museum, there is a memorial to Minnie Vautrin. Additionally, there is a statue of Vautrin in Jinling Women's College, among memorials to the other non-Chinese individuals who helped to protect the college and its inhabitants during the Nanjing massacre.

The hardcore band Hiretsukan honors Wilhelmina Vautrin in their song "Song For Wilhelmina Vautrin" on their 2005 record End States.

== Other ==
She is depicted in Lu Chuan's 2009 film City of Life and Death. In the 2009 film John Rabe, Minnie Vautrin is replaced by the fictitious Valérie Dupres of an "International Girls College" as an important fellow Nanking Safety Zone committee member. In Nanjing Requiem, a 2011 novel by Chinese-born writer and Boston University professor Ha Jin, Ha writes from the perspective of a fictionalized assistant to Vautrin named Anling Gao. Minnie Vautrin's diaries provided inspiration for the novella 13 Flowers of Nanjing written by Geling Yan, which was the basis for the 2011 film The Flowers of War (Chinese: 金陵十三釵; pinyin: Jīnlíng Shísān Chāi), directed by Zhang Yimou.

== See also ==
- Finding Iris Chang
- Nanking
- John Magee (priest)
- John Rabe

== General bibliography ==
- Chang, Iris, The Rape of Nanking: The Forgotten Holocaust of World War II, foreword by William C. Kirby. Penguin USA, 1998. ISBN 0-14-027744-7 (paperback)
- Hu, Hua-Ling, American Goddess at the Rape of Nanking: The Courage of Minnie Vautrin. Southern Illinois University Press, 2000. ISBN 0-8093-2303-6
- Lutz, Jessie Gregory. "Vautrin, Minnie" American National Biography (1999) Vautrin, Minnie (1886–1941), missionary to China
- Secor Centennial Committee, "The Minnie Vautrin Story," in The Secor Centennial Book, 1857–1957, 1957
- Treudley, Mary Bosworth. This stinging exultation (Asian folklore and social life monographs) (1972)

=== Primary sources ===
- Hu, Hua-ling, and Zhang Lian-hong. Undaunted Women of Nanking: The Wartime Diaries of Minnie Vautrin and Tsen Shui-fang (Southern Illinois Press, 2010).
- Vautrin, Minnie. Terror in Minnie Vautrin's Nanjing: Diaries and Correspondence, 1937–38 (University of Illinois Press, 2008).
