= John Rabe =

German diplomat and businessman (1882–1950)

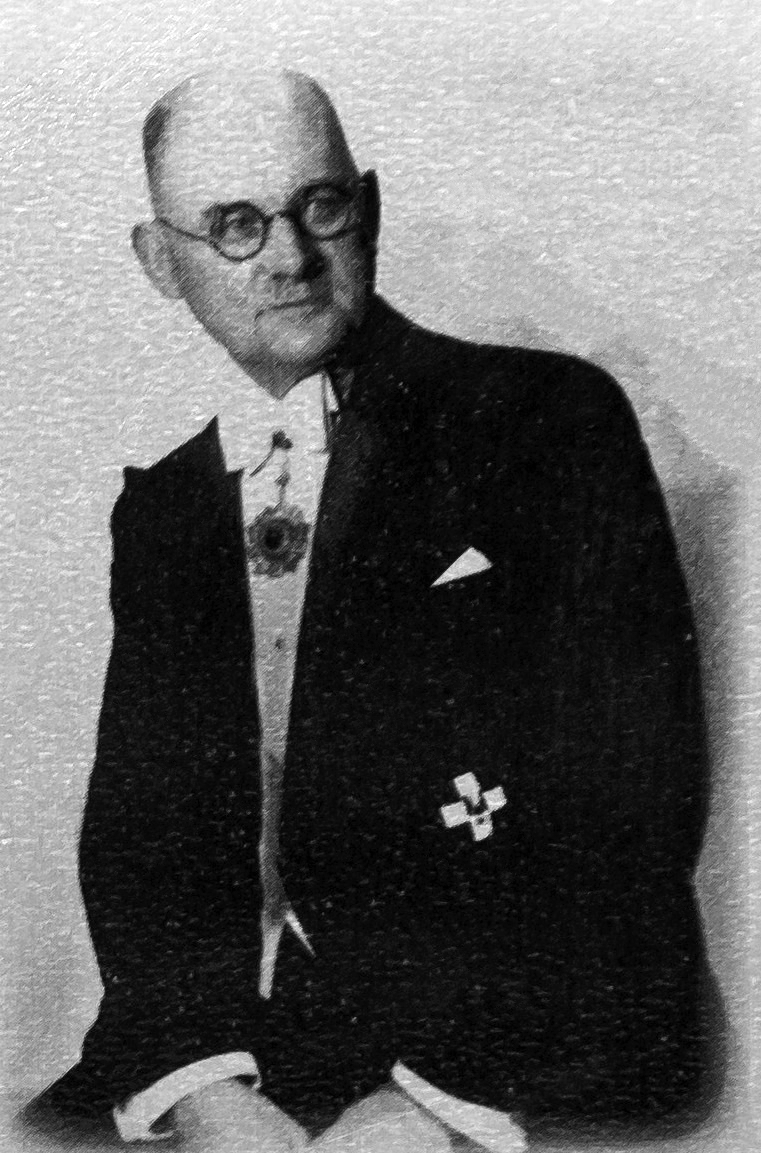
- Born: John Heinrich Detlef Rabe; 23 November 1882; Hamburg, Germany
- Died: 5 January 1950 (aged 67); West Berlin, West Germany
- Resting place: Kaiser Wilhelm Memorial Cemetery, Berlin-Charlottenburg, Germany
- Occupation: Businessman
- Employer: Siemens
- Known for: Saving about 250,000 Chinese civilians during the Nanjing Massacre; Establishing the Nanking Safety Zone
- Political party: Nazi Party (1934–1945)
- Spouse: Dora Rabe (m. 1909)
- Children: 2
- Relatives: Thomas Rabe (grandson)

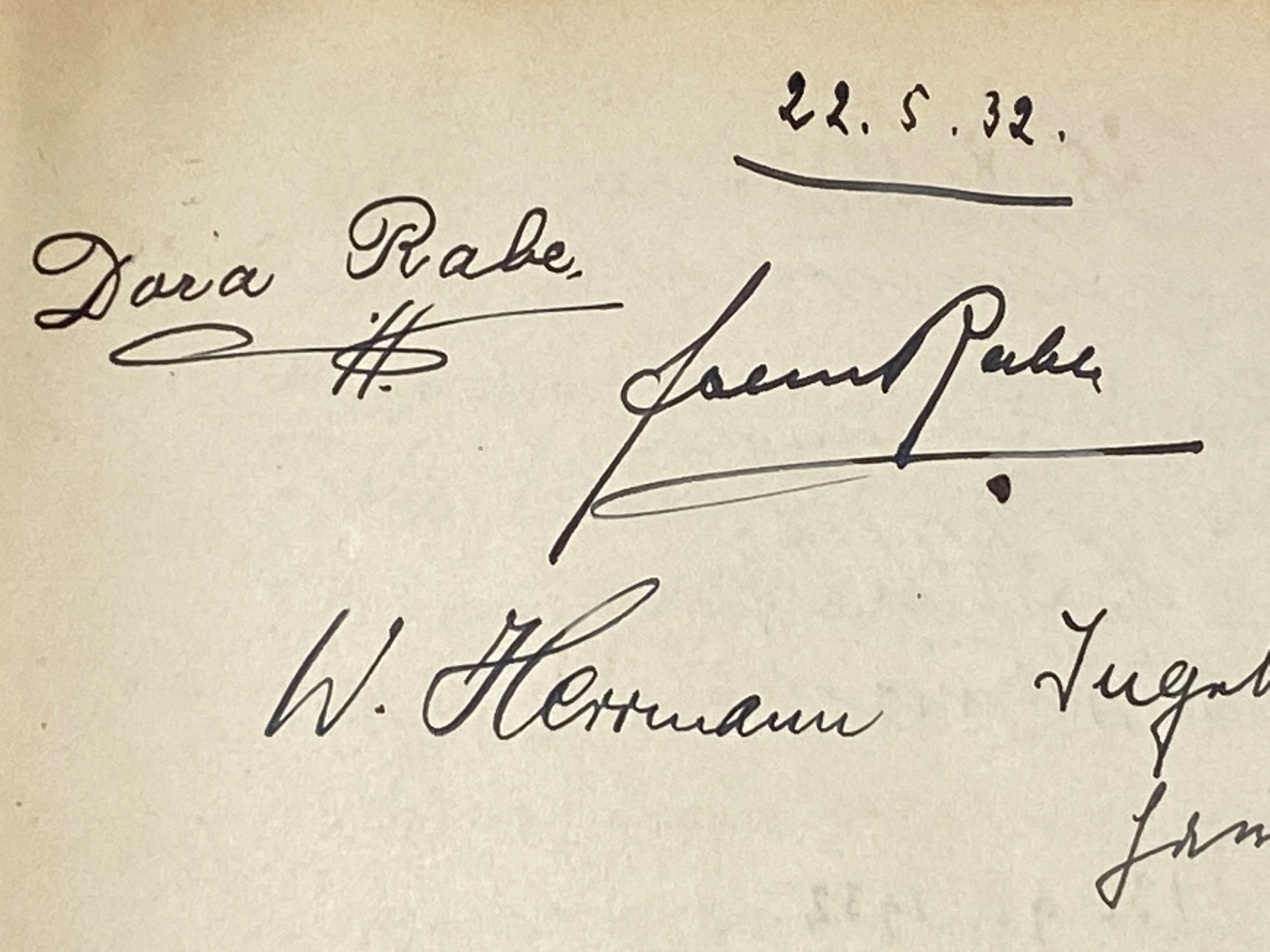
John and Dora Rabe autograph signatures, Nanjing, 22 May 1932

John Heinrich Detlef Rabe (23 November 1882 – 5 January 1950) was a German diplomat and businessman best known for his efforts to stop Japanese war crimes and protect Chinese civilians during the Nanjing Massacre. The Nanking Safety Zone, which he helped to establish, sheltered approximately 250,000 Chinese people from Imperial Japanese Army atrocities. A member of the Nazi Party, Rabe had been sent to China as an official representative of Nazi Germany in the European-U.S. diplomatic quarter in Nanjing, the Republic of China's capital. He served as senior chief of the diplomatic mission at the time of Japanese conquest.

== Early life and career ==
Rabe was born in Hamburg on 23 November 1882. His father died while he was very young. He pursued a career in business and worked for a British company in Mozambique from 1903 to 1906.

In 1908, he left Hamburg via Trans-Siberian Railway bound for Beijing, Great Qing and there he married Dora Caroline Schubert on 25 October 1909. They later had a daughter Margaret and a son named Otto.

Between 1910 and 1938 he worked for the Siemens China Corporation in Mukden, Beijing, Tianjin, Shanghai and later Nanjing.

Rabe suffered from diabetes by the time he worked in Nanjing, requiring him to take regular doses of insulin. He became head of the Siemens branch in Nanjing in 1931. On 1 March 1934 he joined the Nazi Party.

== Establishment of the Nanking Safety Zone ==
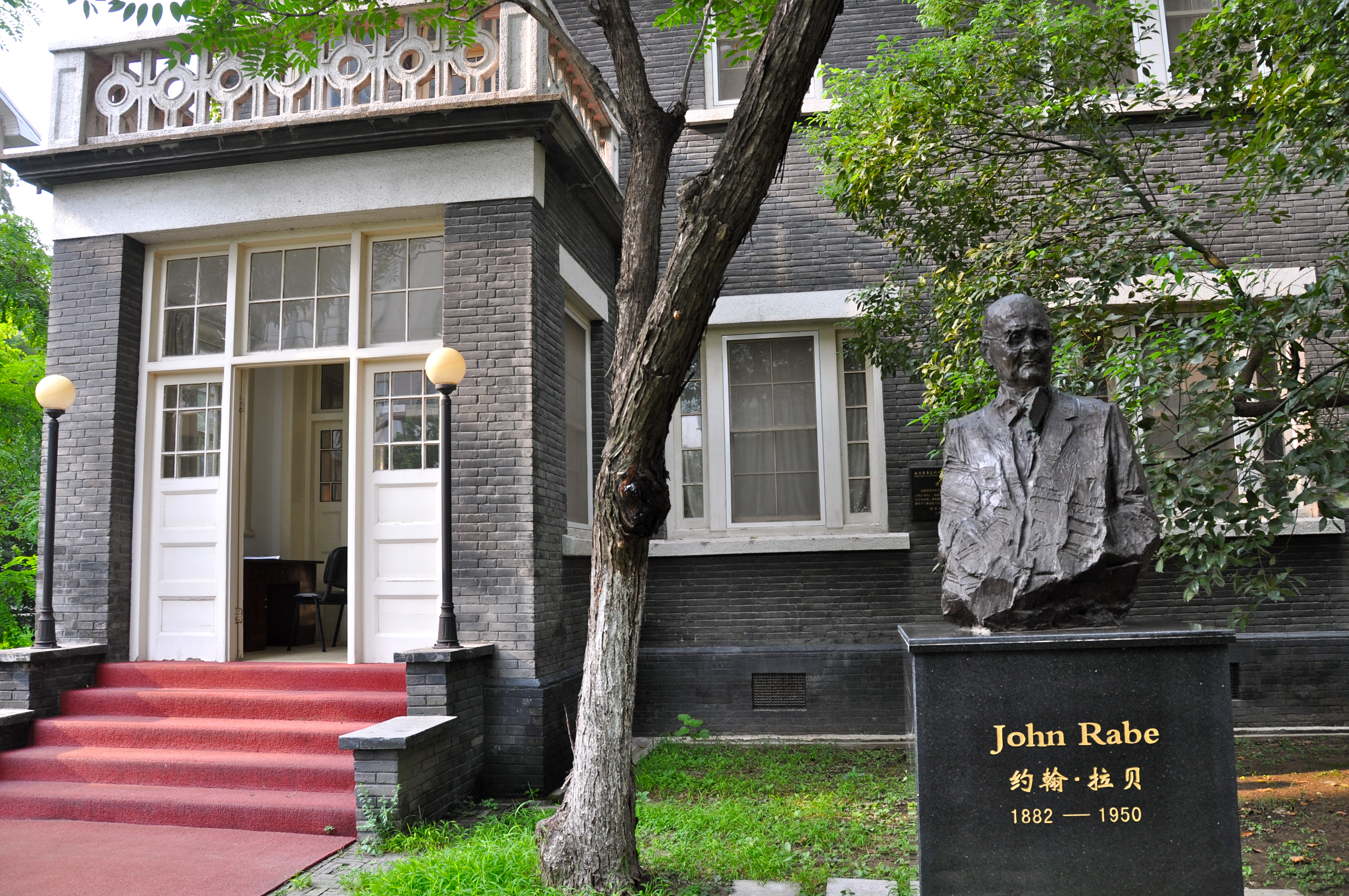
The former residence of John Rabe in Nanjing, located in the Nanking Safety Zone during the Nanjing Massacre

Many Westerners were living in Nanjing, the Chinese capital city, until December 1937, with some conducting trade and others on missionary trips. As the Imperial Japanese Army approached Nanjing and initiated bombing raids on the city, all but 22 foreigners fled, with 15 American and European missionaries and businessmen forming part of the remaining group. As the Japanese Army advanced on Nanjing on 22 November 1937, Rabe, along with other foreign nationals, organized the International Committee for the Nanking Safety Zone and created the Nanking Safety Zone to provide Chinese refugees with food and shelter from the impending Japanese massacre. He explained his reasons as: "there is a question of morality here… I cannot bring myself for now to betray the trust these people have put in me, and it is touching to see how they believe in me". The zones were located in all of the foreign embassies and at Nanjing University.

The committee was inspired by the establishment in November of a similar neutral zone in Shanghai, which had protected approximately 450,000 civilians. Rabe was elected leader of the committee, in part because of his Nazi Party status and the German-Japanese bilateral Anti-Comintern Pact. The committee established the Nanking Safety Zone in the western quarter of the city. The Japanese government had agreed not to attack parts of the city that did not contain Chinese military forces and the members of the International Committee for the Nanking Safety Zone attempted to persuade the Chinese government to move all their troops out of the area. In this they were partly successful. On 1 December 1937, before fleeing the city, Nanjing Mayor Ma Chao-chun ordered all Chinese citizens remaining in Nanjing to move into the Safety Zone. When Nanjing fell on 13 December 1937, 500,000 non-combatants remained in the city. Rabe also opened up his properties to help 650 more refugees.

== Nanjing Massacre ==
According to Rabe, the Nanjing Massacre resulted in the deaths of 50,000 to 60,000 civilians. Rabe and his zone administrators tried frantically to stop the atrocities. Modern estimates of the death toll of the Nanjing Massacre vary, but some put the number of murdered civilians as high as 300,000. Rabe's appeals to the Japanese using his Nazi Party credentials often only delayed them, but the delay allowed hundreds of thousands of refugees to escape. The documentary Nanking credited Rabe with saving the lives of 250,000 Chinese civilians; other sources suggest he saved 250,000 to 300,000. In his diary, Rabe documented Japanese atrocities committed during the assault on and occupation of the city.

In a series of lectures that he gave in Germany after his return, Rabe would say that "We Europeans put the number [of civilian casualties] at about 50,000 to 60,000". Rabe was not the only person to record Japanese atrocities. By December 1937, after the defeat of the Chinese force, Japanese soldiers often went house-to-house in Nanjing, shooting any civilians that they encountered. Additional evidence of these violent acts came from the diaries kept by Japanese soldiers and journalists appalled at what occurred.

Rabe summarized the conduct of Japanese soldiers in Nanjing in the following manner:

I've written several times in this diary about the body of the Chinese soldier who was shot while tied to his bamboo bed and who is still lying unburied near my house. My protests and pleas to the Japanese embassy finally to get this corpse buried, or give me permission to bury it, have thus far been fruitless. The body is still lying in the same spot as before, except that the ropes have been cut and the bamboo bed is now lying about two yards away. I am totally puzzled by the conduct of the Japanese in this matter. On the one hand, they want to be recognized and treated as a great power on a par with European powers, on the other, they are currently displaying a crudity, brutality, and bestiality that bears no comparison except with the hordes of Genghis Khan. I have stopped trying to get the poor devil buried, but I hereby record that he, though very dead, still lies above the earth!

== Return to Germany ==
On 23 February 1938, Rabe left Nanjing. He traveled first to Shanghai, returning to Berlin on 15 April 1938. He took with him a large number of source materials documenting Japanese atrocities in Nanjing. Rabe showed films and photographs of Japanese atrocities in lecture presentations in Berlin, and he wrote to Hitler, asking him to use his influence to persuade the Japanese to stop further violence. Rabe was detained and interrogated by the Gestapo; his letter was never delivered to Hitler. Due to the intervention of Siemens, Rabe was released. He was allowed to keep evidence of the massacre (excluding films) but not to lecture or write on the subject again. Rabe continued working for Siemens, which briefly posted him to the safety of Siemens AG in Afghanistan. Rabe subsequently worked in the company's Berlin headquarters until the end of the war.

== Postwar ==
After the war, Rabe was arrested first by the Soviet NKVD, then by the British Army. Both let him go after intense interrogation. He worked sporadically for Siemens, earning little. He was later denounced by an acquaintance for his Nazi Party membership, losing the work permit he had been given by the British occupational authorities. Rabe proceeded to undergo lengthy denazification efforts (his first attempt was rejected and he had to appeal) in the hope of regaining permission to work. He depleted his savings to pay for his legal defence.

Unable to work and with his savings spent, Rabe and his family survived in a one-room apartment by selling his Chinese art collection but it was insufficient to prevent their malnutrition. He was formally declared "de-Nazified" by the British occupational authorities on 3 June 1946 but continued to live in poverty. His family subsisted on wild seeds, his children eating soup and dry bread until running out of that as well. In 1948, Nanjing citizens learned of the Rabe family's dire circumstances and quickly raised a sum of money equivalent to US$2,000 ($27,000 in 2025). The city's mayor traveled to Germany via Switzerland, where he bought a large amount of food for the Rabe family. From mid-1948 until the proclamation of the People's Republic of China, the people of Nanjing also sent the family a food package each month, for which Rabe wrote many letters expressing deep gratitude.

== Death and legacy ==
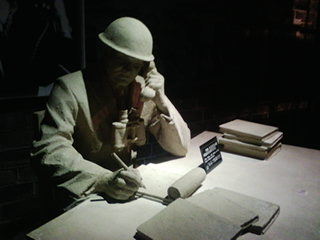
A statue of John Rabe in the Nanjing Massacre Memorial Hall

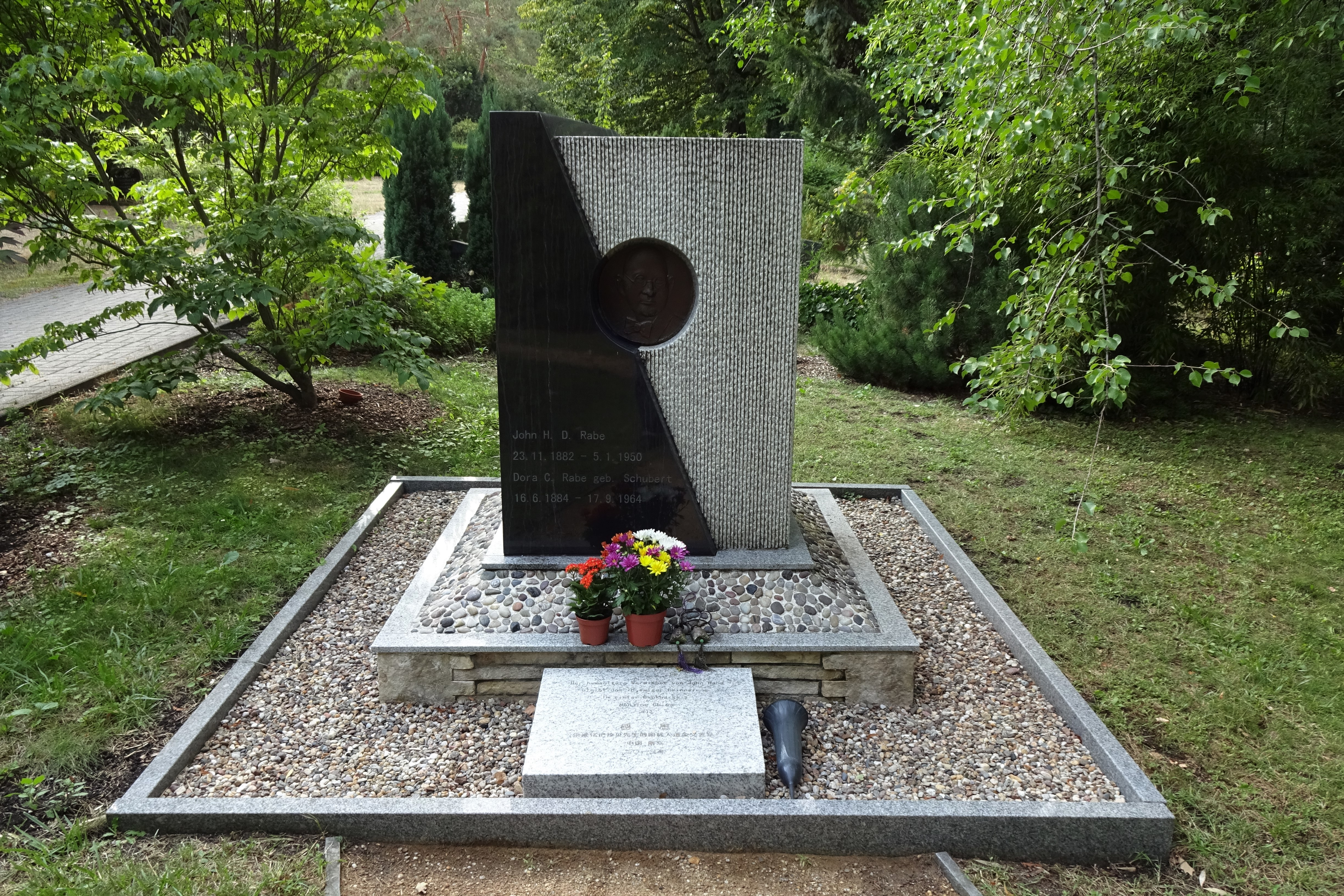
Rabe and Dora grave in Kaiser Wilhelm Memorial Cemetery in Berlin-Charlottenburg, re-erected in 2013

On 5 January 1950, Rabe died of a stroke and was buried at Kaiser Wilhelm Memorial Cemetery in Berlin-Charlottenburg. His wife died on 17 September 1964 and was buried by his side. Since there was a limitation of graveyard usage in Germany, the lease on Rabe's was expired by 1985.

In 1997, their tombstone was moved from Berlin to Nanjing, where it received a place of honour at the massacre memorial site. In 2005, Rabe's former residence in Nanjing, the John Rabe House, was restored to its former state; it houses the John Rabe and International Safety Zone Memorial Hall, opened in 2006. The Austrian Service Abroad was later invited to send a Peace Servant there.

Rabe and his wife's grave at Kaiser Wilhelm Memorial Cemetery was re-erected in October 2013. An inauguration memorial ceremony was held on 12 December 2013 with his grandson Thomas Rabe and the Chinese Ambassador to Germany Shi Mingde in attendance.

== War diaries ==
A selection of Rabe's wartime diaries was published in English as The Good German of Nanking (UK title) or The Good Man of Nanking (US title) (original German title: Der gute Deutsche von Nanking).

== Portrayals in film ==
John Rabe has been portrayed in numerous films:

- In Mou Tun Fei's 1995 film Black Sun: The Nanking Massacre. Minnie Vautrin and George Ashmore Fitch are also depicted.
- In Wu Ziniu's 1995 film Don't Cry, Nanking, actor Ulrich Ottenburger played Rabe, although his name was changed to "John Robbins".
- In Bill Guttentag and Dan Sturman's 2007 documentary film Nanking, actor Jürgen Prochnow played Rabe.
- In Lu Chuan's 2009 film City of Life and Death, actor John Paisley played Rabe.
- In Florian Gallenberger's film John Rabe, also released in 2009, Ulrich Tukur played John Rabe.

== See also ==
- Robert Jacquinot de Besange, a French Jesuit who saved over half a million Chinese civilians.
- Minnie Vautrin, an American missionary who saved thousands of lives during the Nanjing Massacre.
- Robert O. Wilson, an American physician who treated victims brought to the Nanking Safety Zone.
- John Magee, an American priest and missionary who documented the Nanjing Massacre.
- Bernhard Arp Sindberg, a Danish worker who saved thousands of people by harbouring them in a factory during the Nanjing Massacre.
- Georg Rosen, consular employee of the German Foreign Office who helped create the Nanking Safety Zone.
- Chiune Sugihara, Japanese vice-consul of Lithuania who saved the lives of 6,000 Jews during the Holocaust in Lithuania, by allowing them to escape from the then Soviet-, but later Nazi-, occupied country.

== Sources ==
- Erwin Wickert (editor). (1998). The Good Man of Nanking: The Diaries of John Rabe, Knopf. ISBN 0-375-40211-X
- Original German: (1997). John Rabe. Der gute Deutsche von Nanking. Deutsche Verlags-Anstalt, Stuttgart. ISBN 3-421-05098-8
