= Finding Iris Chang =

2007 biography by Paula Kamen

- First edition cover of Finding Iris Chang
- Author: Paula Kamen
- Language: English
- Subject: Iris Chang
- Publisher: Da Capo Press
- Publication date: November 2007
- Publication place: United States
- Media type: Print (Hardcover)
- Pages: 281 pp (first edition)
- ISBN: 0-306-81466-8
- OCLC: 176629634
- LC Class: CT275.C4623 K36 2007

Finding Iris Chang: Friendship, Ambition, and the Loss of an Extraordinary Mind is a biography of Iris Chang, author of the best-selling history book, The Rape of Nanking. Written by Chang's friend, journalist Paula Kamen, and published in November 2007, the book's writing and research were motivated by Chang's suicide in 2004. Kamen authored a Salon.com eulogy for Chang that received an "overwhelming" response, and this prompted her to expand upon the subject of Chang's life and death with a full-length biography.
