= John Magee (missionary) =

American priest in China (1884–1953)

The Reverend John Magee
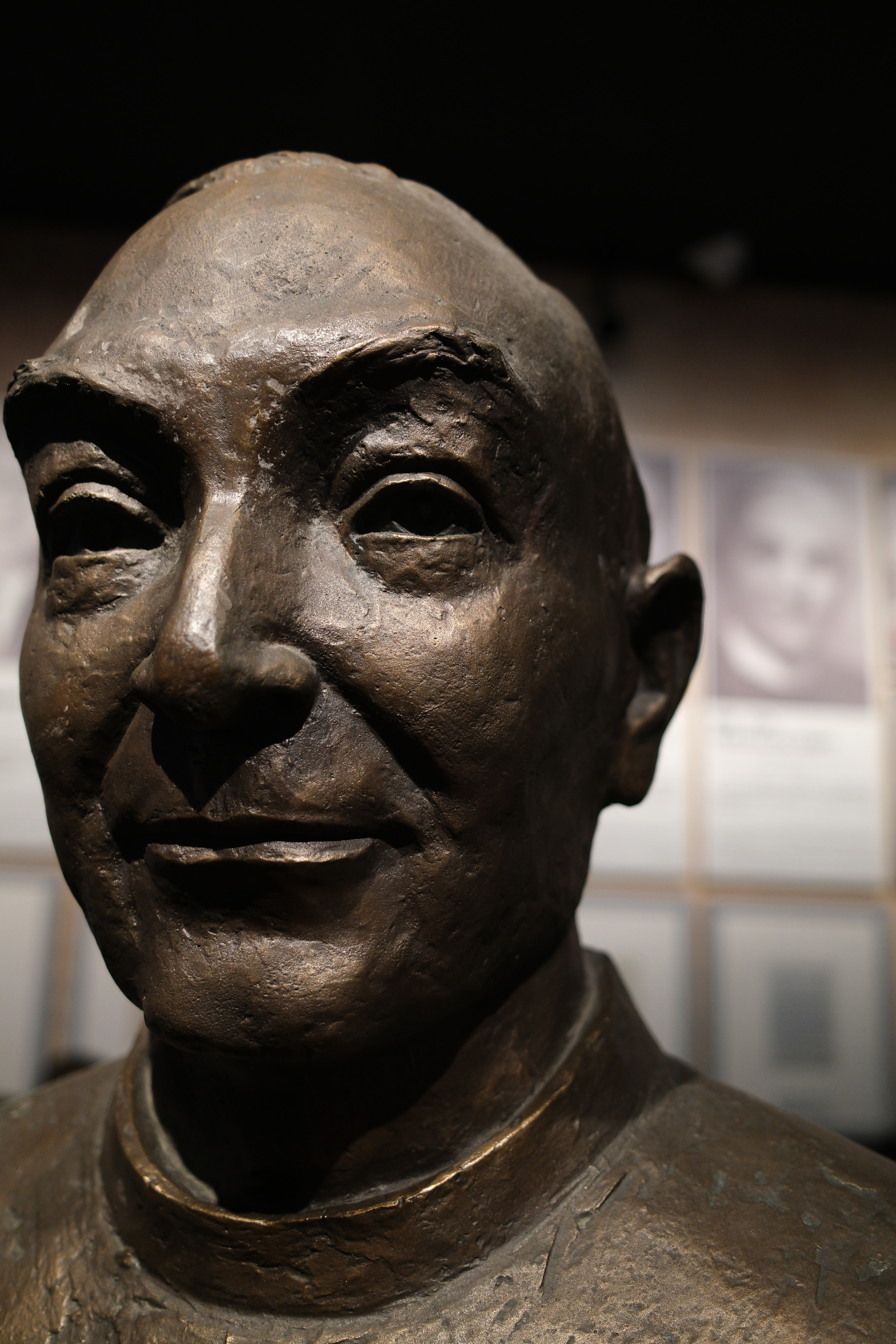
- Bust of Magee at the Nanjing Massacre Memorial Hall

Personal life
- Born: John Gillespie Magee; October 10, 1884 Pittsburgh, Pennsylvania, U.S.
- Died: September 11, 1953 (aged 68) Pittsburgh, Pennsylvania, U.S.
- Spouse: Faith Emmeline Backhouse (m. 1921)
- Children: 4
- Education: Yale University
- Occupation: Priest, missionary

Religious life
- Religion: Christian
- Church: Episcopal Church

The Reverend John Gillespie Magee (October 10, 1884 – September 11, 1953) was an American Episcopal priest, best known for his work in Nanjing as a missionary, and for the films and pictures he shot during the Nanjing Massacre. He is also credited with saving thousands of lives throughout the event.

== Early life and education ==
Magee was born in 1884 in Pittsburgh, Pennsylvania, United States. Magee came from a wealthy Pittsburgh family. His brother was aviator and Congressman James McDevitt Magee. Magee went to school at Yale University, where he was a member of Skull and Bones. After graduating in 1906, he then attended divinity school in Massachusetts. As a missionary in China, he became the minister at an Episcopal mission in Nanjing in 1912.

While in China, Magee married a missionary from Helmingham in Suffolk, England, Faith Emmeline Backhouse, in 1921. They had four sons: John, Hugh, David and Christopher. Their oldest son went on to write the famous poem High Flight, when he served in the Royal Canadian Air Force during the Second World War.

== Nanjing Massacre ==
During the Nanjing Massacre, Magee was performing missionary work in Nanjing and was at the same time the chairman of Nanking Committee of the International Red Cross Organization. During the period when hundreds of thousands of defenseless Chinese were slaughtered by the Japanese army, Magee was appalled by the atrocity of the Japanese invaders.

Disregarding his own safety, Magee ran out of the Nanking Safety Zone, going through streets and lanes, and took part in rescuing more than 200,000 Chinese civilians who were facing being slaughtered. Magee filmed several hundred minutes with what was then the most advanced 16mm movie camera, which he likely filmed with at 18 frames per second.

Some people wanted to buy Magee's original film for large sums of money for political purposes, yet he would not budge. He said he wanted to give the historical materials to the right person without charge at the right moment.

=== The film ===
Magee managed to film abuses of Chinese civilians by Japanese soldiers during the Nanjing Massacre in December 1937. Magee's films were smuggled out of Nanjing; copies were shown to members of the United States government, and sent to the German Foreign Ministry in Berlin, in an unsuccessful attempt to persuade them to institute sanctions against the Japanese government.

On 10 February 1938, the Legation Secretary of the German Embassy, Rosen, wrote to his Foreign Ministry about a film made in December by Magee to recommend its purchase. Here is an excerpt from his letter and a description of some of its shots, kept in the Political Archives of the Foreign Ministry in Berlin:

During the Japanese reign of terror in Nanking – which, by the way, continues to this day to a considerable degree – the Reverend John Magee, a member of the American Episcopal Church Mission who has been here for almost a quarter of a century, took motion pictures that eloquently bear witness to the atrocities committed by the Japanese. (....) One will have to wait and see whether the highest officers in the Japanese army succeed, as they have indicated, in stopping the activities of their troops, which continue even today (...)

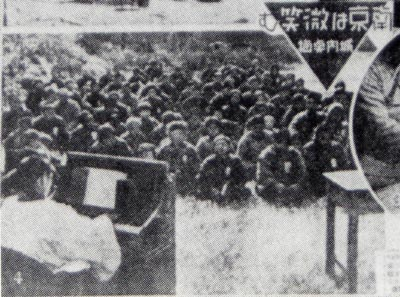
According to the Asahi Shimbun on Dec. 25, 1937, this photo is Magee holding a Sunday worship service and singing hymns with Chinese Christians in Nanjing "after order had been restored to the city".

Magee's role in documenting the Nanjing Massacre is featured in the Chinese film Don't Cry, Nanking. In the film Nanking, Magee was portrayed by actor Hugo Armstrong.

== Later career ==
Magee left Nanjing for U.S in 1938, he went on a tour speaking about the Nanjing Massacre. He served as curate at Church of the Presidents St. John's Episcopal Church, Lafayette Square in Washington, D.C. While there, he was one of the Episcopal priests who officiated at the funeral of President Franklin D. Roosevelt in April 1945. Magee also served as chaplain to President Harry S. Truman. In 1946, Magee attended the Tokyo War Crimes Tribunal to testify as a witness to the war crimes committed in Nanjing.

Magee later served as the Episcopal chaplain at Yale University from 1946 to his death on September 11, 1953.

== Disposition of the Nanjing Massacre film ==
Prior to his death, Magee left the 16mm camera and the film to his son David, who had accompanied him in Nanjing back then.

In 2001, John Magee's son, David Magee, donated the four rolls of film tape (105 minutes in length) that his father documented with a 16mm camera to Nanjing Massacre Memorial Hall.

In 2002, when David heard of the news that China was going to build a museum in memory of the people who were killed during the Nanjing Massacre, he visited Nanjing.

According to his father's last wish, he offered the historical materials without charge. To remember the special contribution that Magee had made to the Nanjing people, a library was built in John Magee’s name.

== See also ==
- Minnie Vautrin
- John Rabe
- Robert O. Wilson
- List of Protestant missionaries in China
- Christianity in China
