= Population of Nanjing in December of 1937 =

Topic related to the Nanjing Massacre

Estimates of the population of Nanjing in December 1937 vary widely from source to source. Scholars have been heavily engaged in attempting to calculate Nanjing (then romanized as Nanking)'s population at this time because of its relevance to estimating the death toll of the Nanjing Massacre.

In December 1937, during the Second Sino-Japanese War between Japan and China, Japanese soldiers marched on the Chinese capital city of Nanjing. Most Chinese residents fled Nanjing, though the number of people within the city was bolstered by the presence of a large garrison of Chinese soldiers defending it. After the fall of the city on December 13, 1937, Japanese soldiers massacred Chinese prisoners of war and civilians in and around the city.

Contemporary data on how many soldiers and civilians inhabited Nanjing at the time of the massacre is contradictory and often unreliable. However, modern scholars have an interest in accurately estimating the number in order to aid them in calculating the number of people who might have been massacred by the Japanese Army. Various recent estimates put the population of the city in December at as many as 500,000 civilians and 150,000 soldiers or as few as 200,000 civilians and 70,000 soldiers.

== Background ==
On December 1, 1937, following the end of the Battle of Shanghai during the Second Sino-Japanese War, Japanese soldiers stationed in the vicinity of Shanghai were ordered to march inland to Nanjing, the capital city of China. The opposing Chinese garrison, the Nanjing Garrison Force, attempted to defend a series of encampment outside of Nanjing, but ultimately could not prevent the Japanese Army from arriving at the walled city by December 9. On December 13, the Japanese Army captured Nanjing and perpetrated the Nanjing Massacre. The Chinese population of Nanjing in December prior to the fall of the city included both the civilian residents of the city and the soldiers of the Nanjing Garrison Force who were defending it.

== Civilian population ==
An official survey conducted in March 1937 had put the total civilian population of Nanjing at 1,019,667. However, most of the city's population, particularly the wealthy and middle class, fled after the Japanese starting bombing it in August. Most of those who stayed behind were the very poor who had nowhere else to go, as well as the officials who had jobs with the city government.

In the first weeks of December, as the Japanese were advancing on the city, rapid population movements took place both into and out of the city. On the one hand, many inhabitants of Nanjing attempted to flee to neighboring villages in the last days before the city's fall. On the other hand, refugees were streaming into the city from the rural villages around Nanjing which were being burned down by the Chinese Army. Starting on December 7, the Chinese Army launched a scorched earth policy of incinerating houses around Nanjing to deprive the oncoming Japanese soldiers of shelter. These chaotic conditions made it difficult to keep track of the city's population.

In November, foreign residents of the city had constituted the International Committee, which in turn created a demilitarized zone for refugees in central Nanjing called the Nanking Safety Zone. By the time of the city's fall, much of Nanjing's remaining population had congregated within the safety zone.

=== Primary sources ===
No official statistics attest to Nanjing's population in December 1937. However, a variety of contemporary estimates do exist, including the views of foreign residents of Nanjing such as John Rabe, statements by Western journalists, the sampling survey conducted by Lewis Smythe, and the population registration of the Japanese occupation.

In December, members of the International Committee, including George Ashmore Fitch and its leader John Rabe, estimated the city's civilian population at approximately 200,000. Rabe, however, revised his estimate upwards on January 14 to "250,000 to 300,000 civilians" in a letter to the Japanese embassy. Rabe stated that earlier figures had been "deliberately cautious guesses". However, when another committee member, Lewis Smythe, compiled a population survey of Nanjing the same year, he reaffirmed that Nanjing's civilian population at the time the city fell was between 200,000 and 250,000.

By contrast, most Western journalists who were in Nanjing in November and December 1937 put forward much lower population numbers of around 150,000. For instance, New York Times reporter F. Tillman Durdin supported the estimate of 150,000. By the time that the Japanese forces occupying Nanjing attempted to formally register the city's entire population in late December, 1937, and early January, 1938, 160,000 people were recorded. However, the Japanese often did not count young children and elderly women in their registration.

| Primary source | Estimate of civilian population | Reference |
|---|---|---|
| Lily Abegg (Swiss journalist) | 150,000 | |
| F. Tillman Durdin | 150,000 | |
| Robert O. Wilson | 150,000-200,000 | |
| Wang Kopang (Chinese policeman) | 200,000 | |
| Eduard Sperling (International Committee member) | 200,000 | |
| Chancellor P. Scharffenberg (employee of the German embassy) | 200,000 | |
| George Ashmore Fitch | 200,000 | |
| John Rabe (December 1937) | 200,000 | |
| Lewis Smythe | 200,000-250,000 | |
| Miner Searle Bates | 221,000 | |
| John Rabe (January 1938) | 250,000-300,000 | |

=== Analysis of scholars ===
Historian Ikuhiko Hata analyzed various estimate for Nanjing's civilian population at the time the city fell to the Japanese Army, and concludes that Lewis Smythe's figures of 200,000-250,000 are the most credible. Australian historian David Askew believes that Smythe's data and the population registration undertaken by the Japanese after the city's fall represent the two most important base figures for estimating Nanjing's population. Askew settles on 200,000 as the number most in line with contemporary sources. He discounts Rabe's later estimate of 250,000-300,000 as being an exaggeration presented to Japanese authorities in the hope of convincing them to provide additional food aid.

On the other hand, Tokushi Kasahara asserts that the contemporary figure of 200,000 strongly underestimates Nanjing's civilian population at the time of the city's fall. He argues that the contemporary figures probably included only those Chinese who had evaded the Japanese Army during and immediately after the battle and successfully escaped to the safety zone. Kasahara cites a letter that Ma Chaojun, the mayor of Nanjing, wrote on November 23 that 500,000 civilians remained in the city and that 200,000 additional refugees from surrounding areas were expected to arrive soon. After that, Nanjing was swollen with refugees due to the Chinese Army's incineration of villages just outside the city. Though Kasahara acknowledges that many Chinese people left the city after November 23, he suspects that the influx of new refugees would likely have brought the city's civilian population up to roughly 400,000-500,000 by the time that the Japanese arrived.

| Scholar | Estimate of civilian population | Reference |
|---|---|---|
| David Askew | 200,000 | |
| Ikuhiko Hata | 200,000-250,000 | |
| Tokushi Kasahara | 400,000-500,000 | |

== The Nanjing Garrison Force ==
On November 20, the Chinese government constituted the Nanjing Garrison Force in order to defend the city and its environs from the Japanese attack. The force consisted of Chinese Army units which had escaped from Shanghai and gradually regrouped in Nanjing. If all the Nanjing Garrison Force's constituent units, which included thirteen infantry divisions, had been at full strength, its total size would have been 180,400. In fact, most of its units are known to have lost a substantial portion of their troop strength during the Battle of Shanghai. Some were hastily reinforced with new recruits, a great number of which were conscripted into service from the city of Nanjing and its suburbs. In early December, the Chinese fought a series of engagements with the Japanese Army along their defenses both outside and inside the city. After the fall of Nanjing, many of the garrison's surviving soldiers cast off their weapons and uniforms and hid amongst the city's civilian population.

=== Primary sources ===
No definitive figures were recorded on the total size of the Nanjing Garrison Force, which included both regular soldiers and a variety of non-combatant laborers and temporary employees handling odd jobs. Many Chinese sources indicate that the Nanjing Garrison Force contained somewhat in excess of 100,000 soldiers. Song Xilian, commander of China's 78th Corps, claimed that the Nanjing Garrison Force was over 110,000 men strong, whereas Li Zongren reported that it numbered "more than 100,000 men." By contrast, Tan Daoping, a staff officer in Nanjing Garrison Force, gave a smaller figure of 81,000 by adding together a unit-by-unit breakdown of the whole force. One Chinese officer, Major Zhang Qunsi, wrote an internal document which stated that the force had only 50,000 men.

Chinese commanders often inflated their own troop strength figures in the hopes of securing additional supplies, as supplies were allocated based on unit size. However, in the case of the Nanjing Garrison Force, the Chinese estimates are similar to those recorded in contemporary Japanese sources. Two high-ranking Japanese officers, Major-Generals Tōichi Sasaki and Mamoru Iinuma, who were at Nanjing at the time of the battle, both concluded that the defending Chinese garrison consisted of 100,000 soldiers.

By contrast, the large majority of foreign observers believed that Nanjing Garrison Force to include roughly 50,000 soldiers or less. A US Army intelligence report concluded that the force was 40,000-50,000 men strong, and likewise F. Tillman Durdin of the New York Times reported its troop strength at 50,000. These lower estimates might refer only to those Chinese soldiers trapped within Nanjing itself during the final days of the battle, and they might not include non-combatant military personnel.

| Primary source | Nanjing Garrison Force troop strength | Reference |
|---|---|---|
| Japan 10th Army | 35,000 | |
| US Army | 40,000-50,000 | |
| Zhang Qunsi | 50,000 | |
| F. Tillman Durdin | 50,000 | |
| Tan Daoping | 81,000 | |
| Toichi Sasaki | 100,000 | |
| Mamoru Iinuma | 100,000 | |
| Li Zongren | 100,000+ | |
| Liu Fei (staff officer in China's general staff) | 100,000+ | |
| Mitsuo Nakazawa (staff officer in Japan's 16th Division) | 100,000-120,000 | |
| Song Xilian | 110,000+ | |

=== Scholarly research ===
To calculate the total size of the Nanjing Garrison Force, scholars have adopted both a "macro approach" and a "micro approach". The macro approach involves collecting primary source estimates of the whole size of the Nanjing Garrison Force and analyzing them. By contrast, the micro approach involves examining estimates of each individual unit within the Nanjing Garrison Force and adding them together to produce an estimate of the size of the whole force.

Among scholars using the macro approach, Ikuhiko Hata accepts the reliability of Mamoru Iinuma and Toichi Sasaki's contemporary estimate of 100,000, which, he notes, is identical to the estimate used in the Republic of China's official history of the war published in Taiwan. Tokushi Kasahara, however, points to the fact that most Chinese officers gave contemporary estimates of over 100,000, which, he contends, likely did not even include men in non-combatant roles such as military laborers. By including military laborers, Kasahara brings the total to about 150,000. Kasahara also argues that the total could be raised further to 200,000 if one includes the 23rd Group Army, which participated in the early stages of the Battle of Nanjing but was not officially a part of the Nanjing Garrison Force.

By contrast, Chinese historian Sun Zhaiwei calculated the size of the Nanjing Garrison Force using a micro approach. Sun combed through various diaries and documents and found contemporary estimates for most of the units of the defending Chinese garrison, which he added together to produce the figure of 96,458. In almost every case, the troop strengths given by the diaries and documents Sun found were much higher than those recorded in the unit-by-unit estimates of Chinese staff officer Tan Daoping. Sun Zhaiwei added in Tan's troop strength estimates of each unit for which Sun was unable to find other estimates in order to produce a minimum figure of 125,458, but in assuming that Tan's figures were underestimates, Sun subsequently inflated them to reach an estimate of 150,108. Sun notes that this final estimate is roughly the mid-way point between the minimum figure of 125,458, and the hypothetical maximum figure of 180,400, which would have been the size of the Nanjing Garrison Force if all its units had been at full strength.

Askew has also used a micro approach to calculate the size of the Nanjing Garrison Force, but is strongly critical of Sun's methods. According to Askew, Sun accepts troop strength estimates which were made before the units in question were depleted fighting the Battle of Shanghai and also assumes that each Chinese consisted of three brigades when, according to Askew, most had been reduced to two. By contrast, Askew generally supports the unit-by-unit estimates of Tan Daoping because of Tan's high-ranking position in the staff of Nanjing Garrison Force commander Tang Shengzhi and because Tan's estimates line up much more closely with the estimates of Western observers. Askew accepts Tan's figures as being the upper range of estimates and notes a few possible areas of overestimation. Most notably, Tan argues that the Nanjing Garrison Force's training brigade comprised 11,000 soldiers, but a contemporary document indicates that it was about fifteen percent below a peak strength of 8,100. Tan also states that the 88th Division contained 7,000 soldiers, but Askew notes that the division's official battle report says 6,000. Askew settles on a range of 73,790-81,500 soldiers for the entire Nanjing Garrison Force.

| Scholar | Nanjing Garrison Force troop strength | Reference |
|---|---|---|
| Yoshiaki Itakura | 50,000 | |
| David Askew | 73,790-81,500 | |
| Ikuhiko Hata | 100,000 | |
| Tokushi Kasahara | 150,000 | |
| Sun Zhaiwei | 150,000 | |

== Application of estimates ==
The significance of population estimates for Nanjing is that they can be used as important base figures for calculating the death toll of the Nanjing Massacre. For example, Tokushi Kasahara believes that the population of Nanjing comprised 400,000-500,000 civilians and 150,000 soldiers, and has concluded that the death toll of the Nanjing Massacre amounted to 160,000-170,000 victims. On the other hand, David Askew believes that the population of Nanjing comprised 200,000 civilians and 73,790-81,500 soldiers, and has concluded that the death toll of the Nanjing Massacre was roughly 40,000 victims.

== See also ==
- Second Sino-Japanese War
- Nanjing Massacre
