= Abegg =

Abegg is a German surname. Notable people with the surname include:

- Bruno Erhard Abegg (1803–1848), Prussian statesman
- Elisabeth Abegg (1882–1974), German educator and resistance fighter
- Jemina Pearl Abegg (born 1987), American rock singer
- Jimmy Abegg (born 1954), American musical and visual artist
- Johann Friedrich Abegg (1765–1840), German theologian
- Julius Friedrich Heinrich Abegg (1796–1868), German criminalist
- Lily Abegg (1901–1974), Swiss journalist
- Marisa Abegg (born 1987), American soccer player
- Richard Abegg (1869–1910), German chemist
