= George Ashmore Fitch =

American Presbyterian minister (1883–1979)

- Born: January 23, 1883; Suzhou, Qing China
- Died: January 21, 1979 (aged 95); Pomona, California, United States
- Burial place: Valley View Cemetery, Essex County, New York
- Education: College of Wooster; Union Theological Seminary; Columbia University
- Occupations: Minister; Various roles in the YMCA of China and southern Korea
- Known for: Documentation and assistance of victims during the Nanjing Massacre; Assisting the Kuomintang and Korean Provisional Government
- Children: 5

Chinese name
- Chinese: 費吾生
Transcriptions
Standard Mandarin
- Hanyu Pinyin: Fèi Wúshēng
- Wade–Giles: Fei Wu-sheng

George Ashmore Fitch (January 23, 1883 – January 21, 1979) was an American Presbyterian missionary that lived and worked in China, southern Korea, and Taiwan. Fitch notably smuggled out of Nanjing some of the only known reels of film that documented the Nanjing Massacre.

Fitch was born and raised in China, and was a fluent speaker of Chinese. He and his siblings went to the United States for their education, but all returned afterwards and worked in various religious and humanitarian roles. Fitch himself worked with the YMCA for most of his career.

He is most notable for his assistance of civilians and documentation of the Nanjing Massacre. Fitch served as director of the International Committee for the Nanking Safety Zone, and like John Rabe, was one of the few foreigners in the city at that time. When he eventually left the city, he smuggled with him evidence of the atrocities. He then embarked on a public awareness tour across the United States that drew significant media attention.

Fitch and his wife are also remembered in South Korea for their roles as Korean independence activists. They provided aid to and befriended notable Korean politicians, including first President of South Korea Syngman Rhee and President of the Provisional Government of Korea Kim Ku. After he left China, Fitch eventually served as head of the South Korean YMCA between 1947 and 1949.

== Early life and education ==
Fitch was born on January 23, 1883, in Suzhou, Jiangsu Province, China. He was born the fourth child of his parents, Presbyterian missionaries George Field Fitch (1845–1923) and Mary McLellan Fitch (1848–1918). (Note: Father's Chinese name: simplified Chinese: 费启鸿; traditional Chinese: 費啓鴻; pinyin: Fèi Qǐhóng; Wade–Giles: Fei Ch'i-hung) He had a brother and three sisters. (Note: Siblings: Robert Ferris (Chinese: 司徒華林; 1873–1954), Mary Elliot (1875–?), Jeannette Griswold (1878–1945), and Alice (1884–1971).) Fitch and his siblings were all born in China.

=== Parents' work in China ===
Fitch's parents had arrived in China on November 5, 1870. During that time, they were active in the Christian community in both Shanghai and Suzhou. Fitch's father served as the chairman of the Chinese branch of the U.S. Presbyterian Mission Agency. They held bible study sessions every Wednesday, in which they encountered high-profile Chinese people, including Sun Yat-sen, Tang Shaoyi, and Wang Chonghui.

Fitch's parents also corresponded with a number of Korean Christians during their time in China, including Yun Chi-ho and Lyuh Woon-hyung. While the Fitches' interest in Korea was initially primarily religious, after the Japanese formally colonized Korea in 1910, the Fitches began providing assistance to Korean independence activists. For example, in 1919, they helped Ahn Chang-ho and the Korean Provisional Government with the reestablishment of the Korean Red Cross, as the original had been forcefully absorbed into the Japanese Red Cross in 1909. In addition to providing direct aid, they also shared their connections to important people with the Koreans. For example, they introduced Lyuh to Charles Richard Crane on November 28, 1918. However, these activities drew the ire of the Japanese government, who went on to monitor the family for decades.

=== Return to America ===
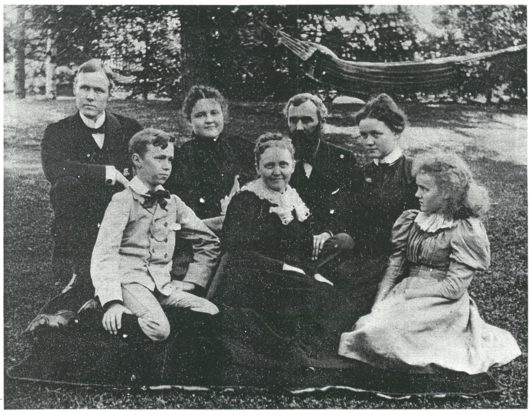
The Fitch family in New York (1897)

Fitch and his siblings all returned to the United States for schooling and went back to China to work as missionaries. Fitch returned to the United States in 1900 to pursue his education. He graduated from the College of Wooster, Ohio in 1906, and Union Theological Seminary in New York with a Bachelor of Divinity in 1909. He also studied at Columbia University around this time.

== Career before World War II ==
His first official post was as chaplain at the Riverview Military Academy from 1906 to 1907. He then served as assistant pastor of the First Presbyterian Church in New York City.

In 1909, he was ordained in the Presbyterian Church. He then arrived in Shanghai, China on 25 December to work with YMCA. In 1912, he briefly visited Korea during one of his trips to Moscow via Manchuria and Siberia.

In February 1923, his father also died, and Fitch briefly returned to the United States. (Note: Also on the boat were Korean independence activists, including Maria Kim.) Around this time, his wife Geraldine became close friends with the wife of Chiang Kai-shek, Soong Mei-ling.

=== Assisting the Korean independence movement ===
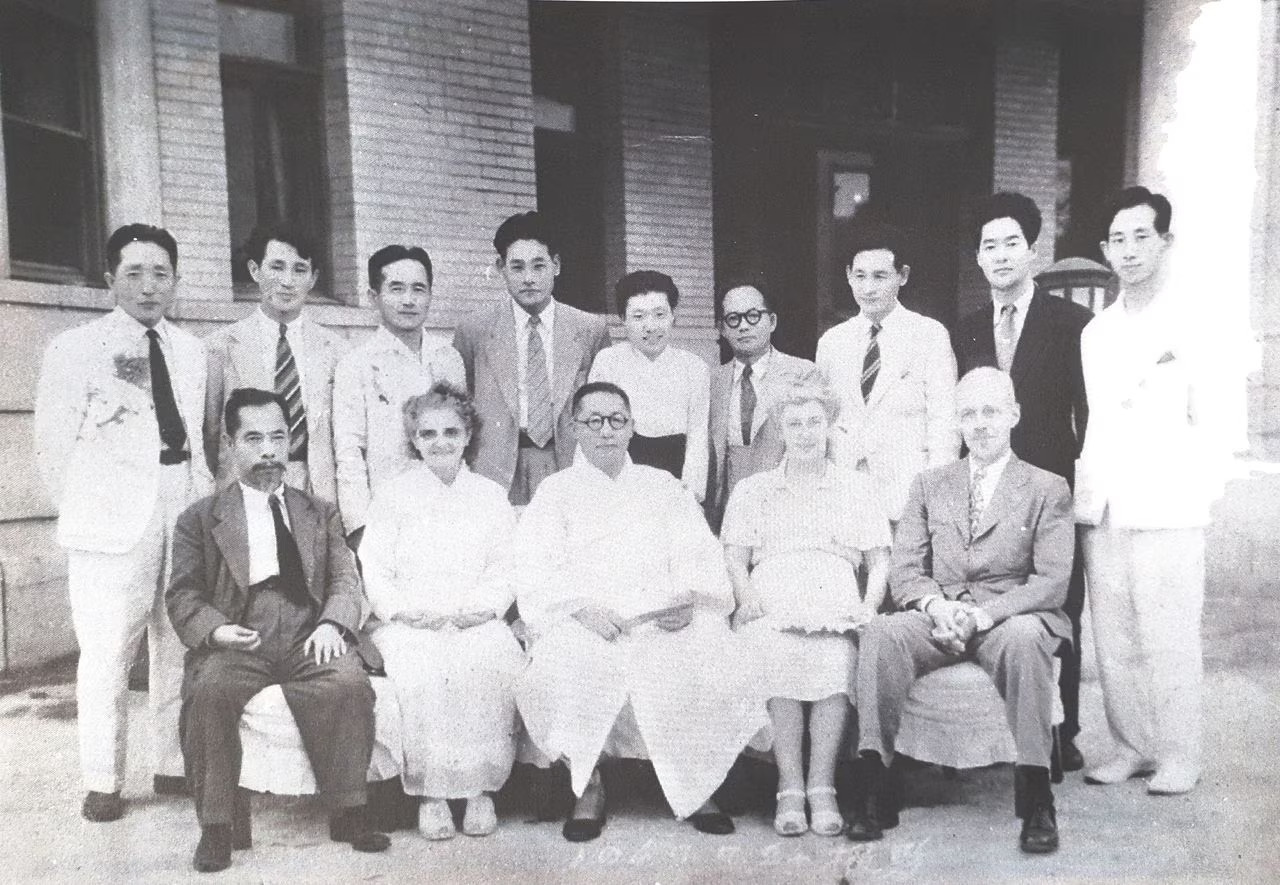
The Fitch couple and notable Korean independence activists. Bottom row from the right are Fitch, his wife Geraldine, Kim Ku, and Franziska Donner (later the first First Lady of South Korea).

Like his father, Fitch assisted Koreans for much of his lifetime, and in his autobiography stated that he considered many prominent Koreans as his friends. In his 1967 autobiography, he said of Koreans:

The Japanese had been telling the world that Koreans were backward, inept, and incapable of self-government. Instead, they are highly intelligent and inventive. [...] They are generous, almost to the point of improvidence. Many of the Christians are conscientious tithers. The way they have supported their churches and the YMCA, when they have so little for themselves, is noteworthy. [...] Is it any wonder that I look back upon my three years in Korea as among the richest and most gratifying in my life?

According to Fitch's autobiography, he helped facilitate the later South Korean president Syngman Rhee's move to the United States. In 1932, Fitch helped hide and facilitate the escape of Kim Ku and other members of the Korean Provisional Government (KPG) in the aftermath of the KPG's assassination of Japanese colonial personnel at Hongkou Park. He also advocated for Ahn Changho's release after Ahn's arrest for allegedly being connected to the bombing. He also introduced Jo So-ang to the Kuomintang Foreign Minister Guo Taiqi.

== Nanjing Massacre ==
In September 1936, Fitch went to Nanjing (then called "Nanking") after being appointed general manager of the Nanjing YMCA. However, after the outbreak of the Second Sino-Japanese War on July 7, 1937, Fitch became an advisor for the War Area Service Corps, a Chinese organization that provided soldiers with basic needs.

Fitch was one of 27 Westerners who chose to remain in the city during the Battle of Nanking.

Nanking Safety Zone International Committee, left to right: Ernest H. Forster, Lewis Strong, John H.D. Rabe, Lewis Smythe, Eduard Sperling, George Ashmore Fitch

Fitch served as director of the International Committee for the Nanking Safety Zone at the time. When the massacre began, he worked with John Rabe and Searle Bates to protect civilians from the atrocities of the Imperial Japanese Army. He kept a diary and collected photo and video evidence of the war crimes.

Complete anarchy has reigned for ten days-it has been hell on earth... to have to stand by while even the very poor are having their last possession taken from them-their last coin, their last bit of bedding (and it is freezing weather), the poor ricksha [sic] man his ricksha; while thousands of disarmed soldiers who had sought sanctuary with you together with many hundreds of innocent civilians are taken out before your eyes to be shot or used for bayonet practice and you have to listen to the sounds of the guns that are killing them; while a thousand women kneel before you crying hysterically, begging you to save them from the beasts who are preying on them; to stand by and do nothing while your flag is taken down and insulted, not once but a dozen times, and your home is being looted and then to watch the city you have come to love and the institution to which you have planned to devote your best deliberately and systematically burned by fire-this is a hell I had never before envisaged.

— George Ashmore Fitch, Diary, December 24, 1937

=== Awareness and advocacy campaign ===
On January 23, 1938, Fitch and 13 other Americans were allowed to leave the city on a Japanese military train. He smuggled in the lining of his coat eight reels of 16 mm negative movie film that contained evidence of the massacre. The film mainly contained evidence filmed by John Magee at the Nanjing University Hospital. This evidence later proved instrumental in the International Military Tribunal for the Far East (also "Tokyo War Crimes Tribunal") in 1946, which he would later testify in. After Fitch's departure, Hubert Lafayette Sone was elected administrative director of the successor to the Nanking Safety Zone, the Nanjing International Relief Committee.

He briefly stayed in Shanghai, Hong Kong, and Guangzhou. He then took the Philippine Clipper and arrived in San Francisco on March 9. He then flew to Washington, D.C., on March 17 and provided his first-hand account of the Massacre to U.S. State Department officials.

Afterwards, he toured the United States and gave speeches and showed movies of the massacre to various audiences. He visited cities like San Francisco, Los Angeles, New York City, Chicago, and Seattle. In a speech at the Cleveland Heights Presbyterian Church, he said:

The destruction of Nanking was the blackest page in modern history [...] The Japanese for two months kept up continuous looting, burning, robbing and murdering [...] Chinese men by the thousands were taken out to be killed by machine guns or slaughtered for hand grenade practice. [...] The poorest of the poor were robbed of their last coins, deprived of their bedding and all that they could gather out of a city systematically destroyed by fire. There were hundreds of cases of bestiality inflicted upon Chinese women.

Fitch was quoted in a June 11, 1938, story about Fitch's advocacy published in the San Francisco Chronicle:

I heard the cries of tens of thousands of women kneeling and praying for help which we were helpless to give. First, their husbands and sons were torn from them and ruthlessly murdered. Then night after night squads of Japanese soldiers would invade the neutral zone and drag away hundreds of them, crying hysterically, to be subjected to unspeakable indignities. Theirs was a fate worse than death.

== End of World War II ==
Fitch returned to China in 1939 to serve with YMCA and later with the United Nations Relief and Rehabilitation Administration until 1947. He also followed the Kuomintang's flight to Chongqing. Between 1941 and 1943, he served as executive advisor to the Chinese Industrial Cooperatives. Around this time, Fitch provided intelligence and assistance to the US Office of Strategic Services to counter the Japanese invasion. He also worked as a Chinese-English interpreter.

Around 1944, he helped coordinate logistics for the US military on the Burma Road. He was also appointed head of the YMCA in Lanzhou in that year.

=== Continued activism for Korea ===
The Fitch couple joined two organizations that Syngman Rhee founded: the Korea–America Association (KAA) in 1942 and the Christian Friends of Korea in 1943. (Note: Korea-America Association (Korean: 한미협회; Hanja: 韓美協會) and the Christian Friends of Korea (기독교인친한회; 基督敎人親韓會))

Geraldine Townsend Fitch (1892–1976). Missionary, Korean independence activist, and second wife of Fitch

During the early 1940s, Geraldine stayed in the United States and actively participated in both of these groups. She wrote an article on behalf of the KAA and KPG that was published in The New York Times. She also advocated for the formal recognition of the KPG by the Kuomintang and by the US government via her connections to Soong Mei-ling and Eleanor Roosevelt. Through these efforts, she became close to influential Korean Americans such as Rhee and Yong-jeung Kim.

George also advocated for the formal recognition of the KPG. In June 1944, he sent a letter to the US Department of State with twelve points that advocated for the recognition of the KPG.

=== End of the War ===
Upon the end of the war in August 1945, Fitch announced his retirement from the YMCA. He then served as deputy director of the United Nations Relief and Rehabilitation Administration in the flooded Yellow River area of Kaifeng in 1946. After this role, Fitch, then around 63 year old, intended to retire.

== Korea and Taiwan ==
However, Fitch was called back to work for the YMCA as the head of its South Korean branch. On July 7, 1947, the Fitch couple arrived on the peninsula. Fitch established YMCA meeting halls around the country and distributed relief aid for two years. He also reunited with his long-time friends Syngman Rhee and Kim Ku. He was present on the peninsula during the 1949 assassination of Kim Ku, and he attended Kim's funeral in Seoul. Fitch left Korea on August 8, 1949, and returned to the United States.

In 1951, he resigned his post as head of the Korean YMCA and went to Taiwan, where the Kuomintang had retreated to after their 1949 loss of the Chinese Civil War. In Taiwan he served as advisor to the physics department of Tamkang University in Taiwan between 1958 and his retirement in 1963.

== Death and legacy ==
In 1963, Fitch retired to Pomona, California. (Note: A Korean encyclopedic source says he retired to Claremont, California, but the New York Times article about his death says he retired to Pomona. Pomona assumed because the Times article is more contemporary.) There, he died at the age of 95 on January 21, 1979, in a nursing home.

Fitch and his wife Geraldine are now buried in the Valley View Cemetery of Essex County, New York.

=== Legacy ===
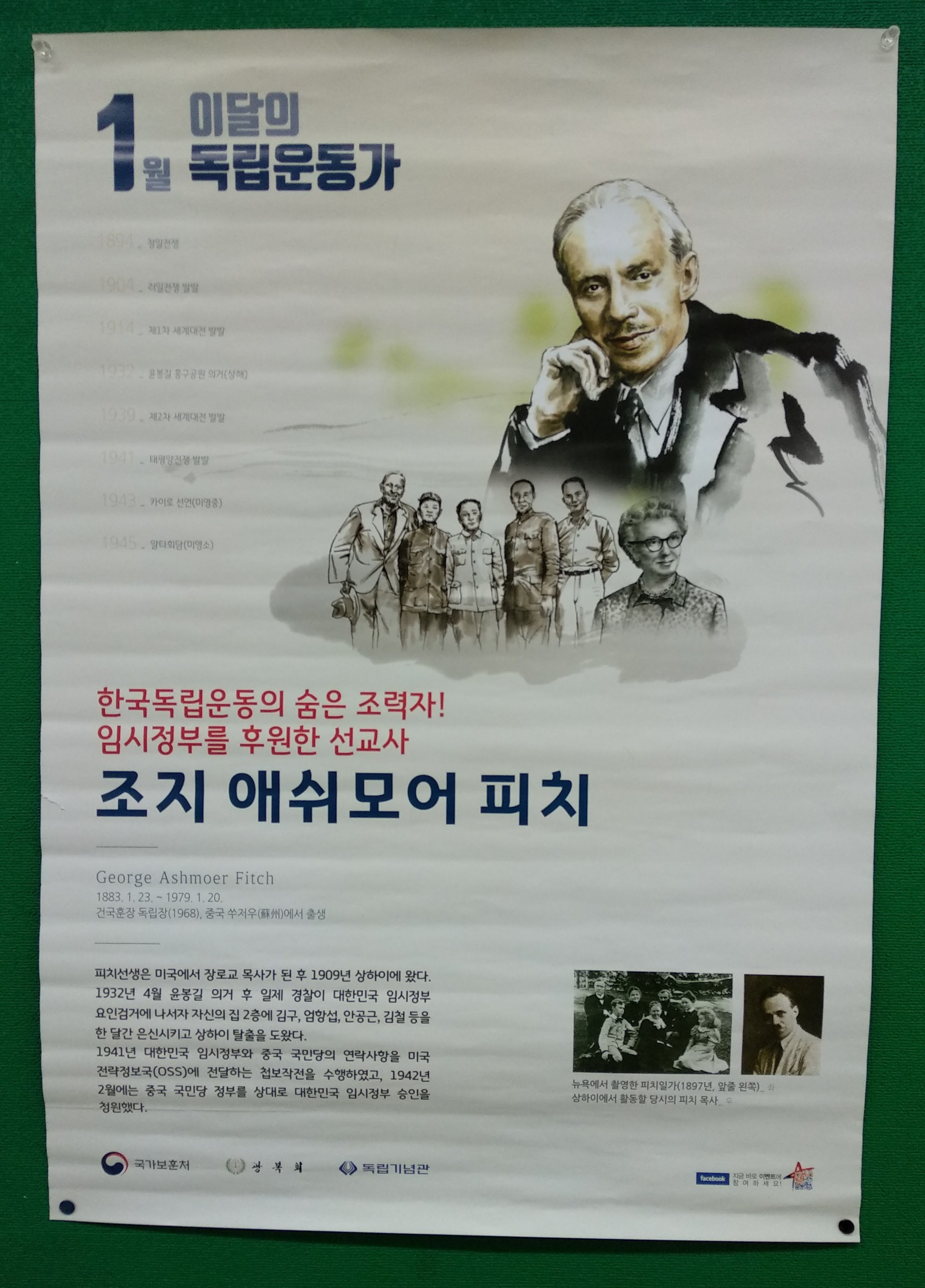
Poster from the South Korean Ministry of Patriots and Veterans Affairs commemorating Fitch as the independence activist of the month for January 2018.

For his role in the Korean independence movement, Fitch is remembered fondly in South Korea. On January 8, 1952, Fitch received the Order of Cultural Merit from the South Korean government. On March 1, 1968, Fitch was among 56 foreigners who were awarded the Order of Merit for National Foundation. As of 2015, Fitch was among 46 foreigners to have received the award.

On December 12, 2016, Li Qiang, then the Party Secretary of Jiangsu, awarded Fitch and five others the Zijin Grass International Commemorative Medal of Peace for their role in protecting civilians during the Nanjing Massacre.

The personal documents of him and his wife between 1909 and 1949, including their correspondence with Syngman Rhee, Eleanor Roosevelt, and Chiang Kai-shek, are held in the Fitch collection at the Harvard–Yenching Library of Harvard University.

== Personal life ==
Fitch's first wife was Alberta Casterlin Kempton (1887–1919), whom he met while studying in the United States in 1910. They married around 1911 in Bristol, United Kingdom. To get there from Shanghai, they took the Trans-Siberian Railway. The couple had four children together, two daughters and two sons. However, she died in February 1919 from typhoid fever.

In 1924, he married Geraldine Townsend (1892–1976) in Albion, Michigan. Townsend was a Methodist missionary in Shanghai. They had two sons together. Townsend was also active in supporting the Chinese Nationalist government and the Korean Provisional Government, for which she is remembered fondly in Korea. In 1947, she helped integrate the female branch of Chung-Ang University into a coed program. For these efforts, she received an honorary degree from the school.

In total, Fitch had six children, including four sons (George Kempton, Albert, John, and Robert) and two daughters (Marion and Edith). All children with the exception of Albert were born in China.

He was fluent in Chinese. According to the Freemason Grand Lodge of China website, Fitch was a Freemason that served as the fifth Grand Master of that lodge, between 1958 and 1959.

Fitch was the grandfather of politician George B. Fitch, who served as mayor of Warrenton, Virginia, and founded the infamous Jamaican Bobsled Team that competed in the 1988 Winter Olympics.

== In popular culture ==
- Portrayed in the 1995 film Black Sun: The Nanking Massacre.
- William J. MacDonald, the creator of the HBO series Rome, wrote an unproduced screenplay that featured Fitch as a character.
- Portrayed by John Getz in the 2007 documentary film Nanking.

== Bibliography ==
- To the Mecca of Inner Mongolia
- George A. and Geraldine T. Fitch, My Eighty Years in China (1967)
