= International Red Cross Committee of Nanking =

During the Japanese-led Nanjing Massacre, the International Red Cross established a contingent in the city to coordinate the humanitarian aid effort.

== Members ==
Members of The International Red Cross Committee of Nanking
Name	Nationality / Occupation	Organization
John Magee	American missionary	American Church Mission
Li Chuin-nan	Chinese	
Walter Lowe	Chinese	
Ernest Forster	American missionary	St. Paul Church
Christian Kröger	German	
Mary Twinem	Chinese-American	
Minnie Vautrin	American missionary	Ginling Girls' College
Robert O. Wilson	American physician	Drum Tower Hospital (Nanking University Hospital)
P. H. Munro-Faure	British businessman	Asiatic Petroleum Co.
C.S. Trimmer	American physician	Drum Tower Hospital (Nanking University Hospital)
James McCallum	American missionary	Drum Tower Hospital (Nanking University Hospital)
Miner Searle Bates	American professor	University of Nanking
John Rabe	German businessman	Siemens Co.
Lewis S. C. Smythe	American professor	University of Nanking
Rev. W. Plumer Mills	American missionary	American Church Mission
Cola Podshivoloff	Russian (White)	
Pastor Shen Yu-shu	Chinese	Christian minister

== Activities ==
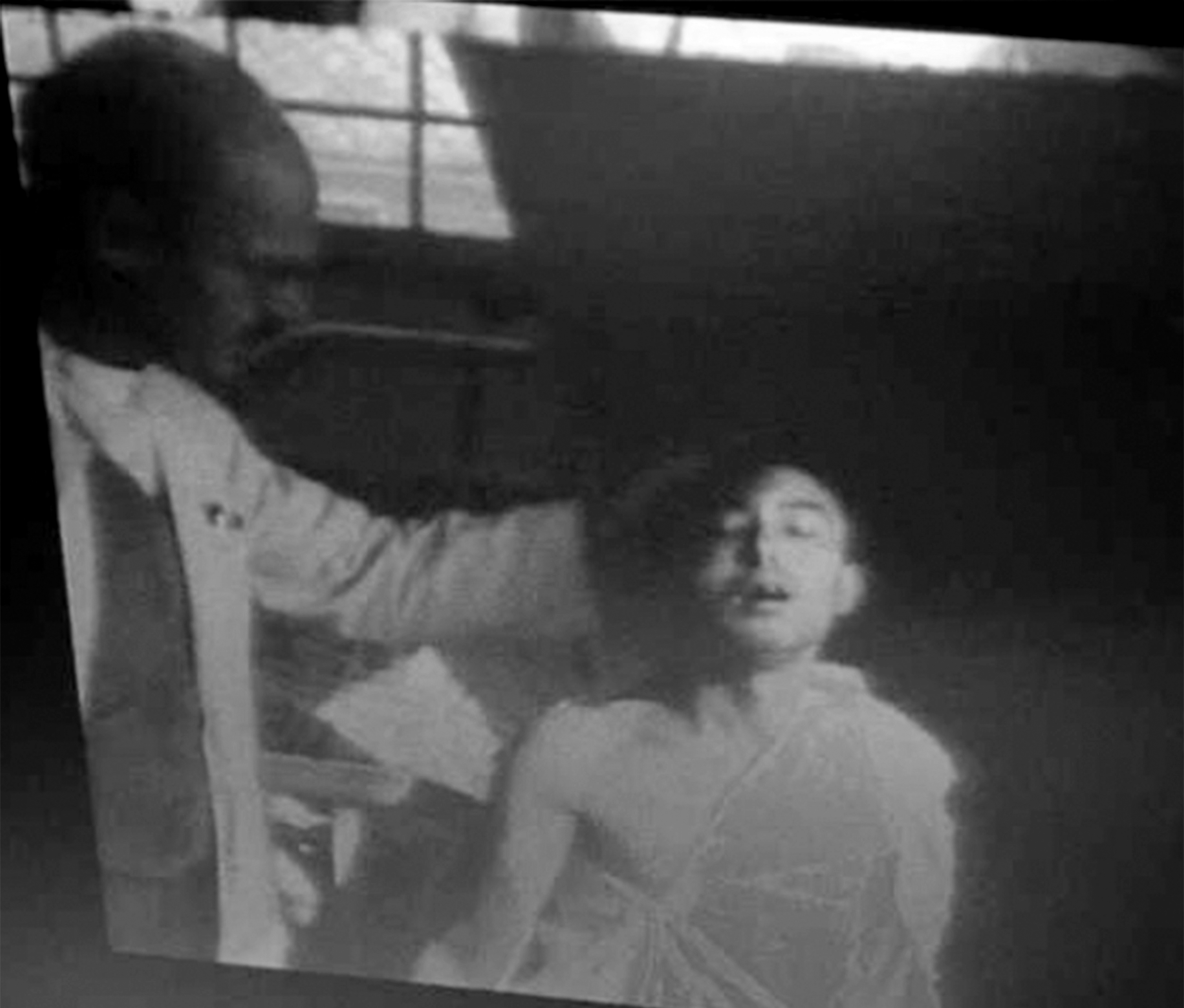
Dr. Wilson cared for wounded Chinese citizen in 1937

Below is listed their responsibilities, and/or their mini-biographies if known and not already linked above:

=== John Magee ===
John Magee was an Episcopalian minister and the Red Cross chairman of the Nanking Branch. In his role with the Red Cross, he provided care to the hospitalized wounded, but is also known for filming what he saw on the streets of Nanjing, providing documentary evidence to the world.

=== Minnie Vautrin ===
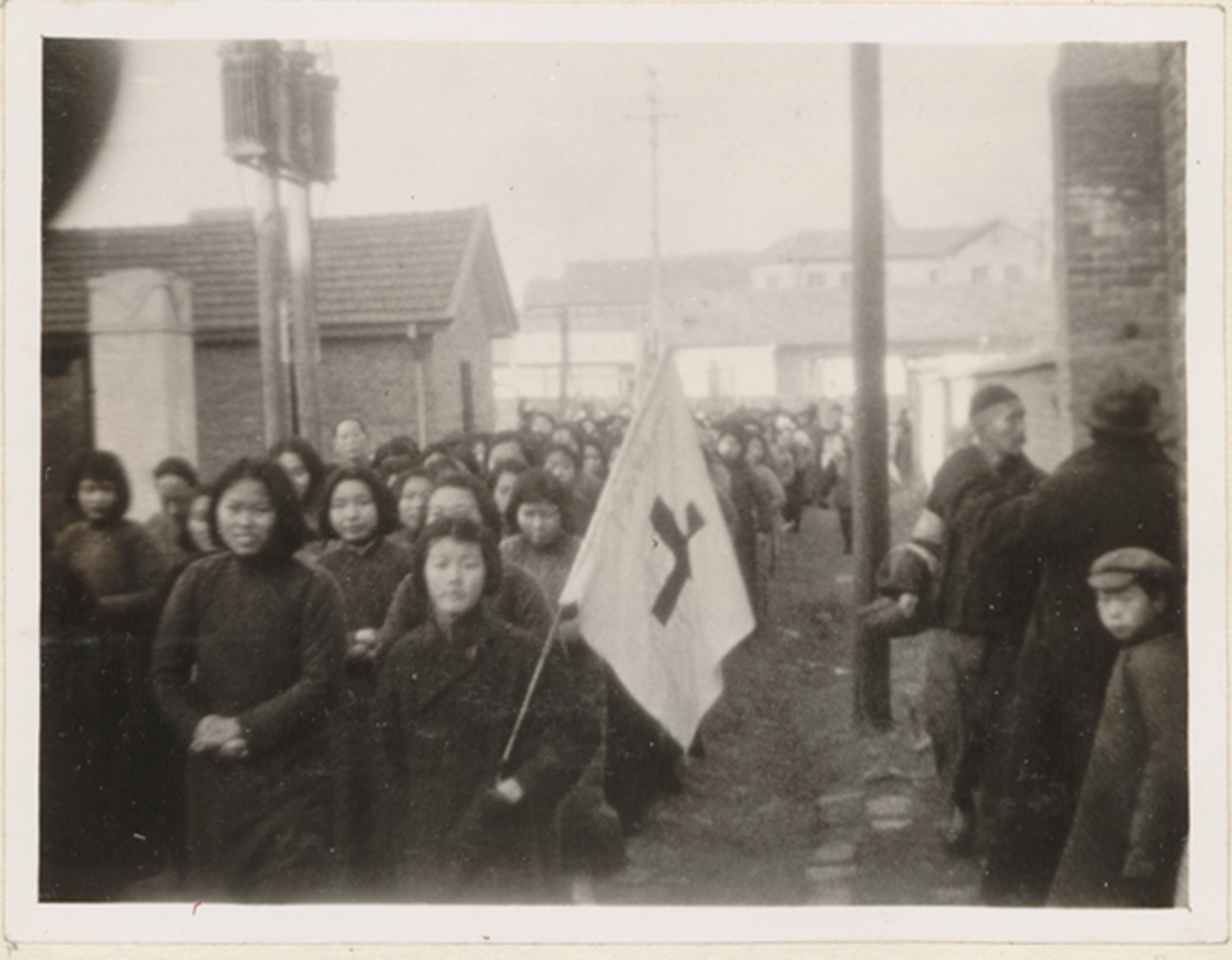
Minnie Vautrin helped the Chinese refugees in 1937

Through Minnie Vautrin's efforts, Ginling Girls College became a haven of refuge, at times harboring up to 10,000 women in a college designed to support between 200 and 300. With only her wits and the use of an American flag, Vautrin was able to repel incursions into her college and thereby protected thousands of Chinese women from being raped as she oversaw the refugee camp at Ginling Women's Arts and Science College where she served as the acting president.

=== James McCallum ===
James McCallum drove the Drum Tower Hospital ambulance to pick up wounded around the city day and night, fighting to keep himself awake.

=== Grace Bauer ===
Grace Bauer worked in the Drum Tower Hospital to help care for the wounded who poured in.

=== Mary Twinem ===
Mary Twinem, née Fine (費馬利), or Mrs. Paul de Witt-Twinem, taught at Kwang-hwa High School, where she was one of Soong Mei-ling's teacher. An American from Trenton, New Jersey, she was later naturalized as a Chinese citizen and considered herself Chinese.
