= Wilson Plumer Mills =

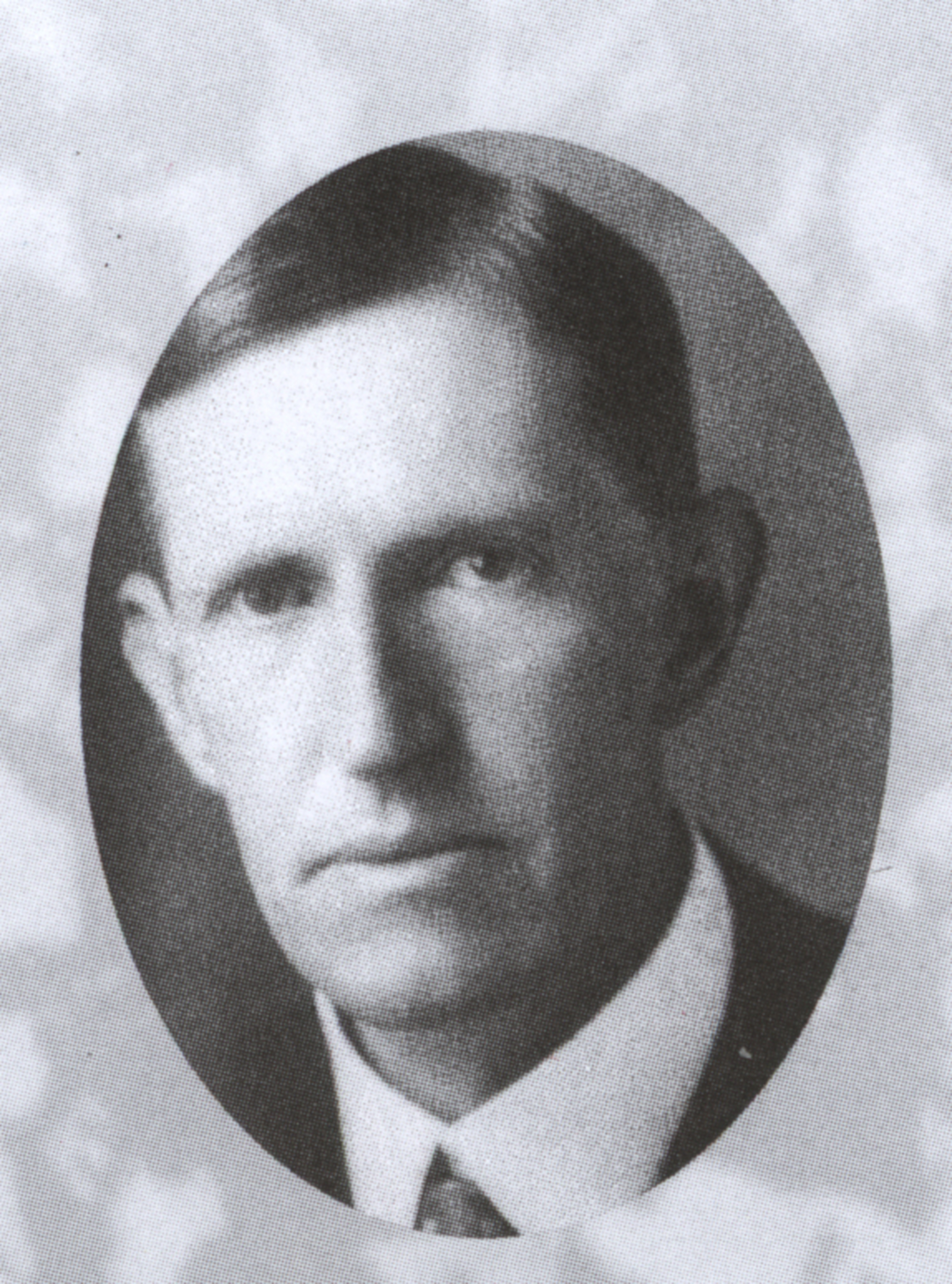
Wilson Plumer Mills

Wilson Plumer Mills (December 1, 1883–February 26, 1959, Chinese: 米尔士) was an American missionary and humanitarian known for his efforts to protect civilians during the Nanjing Massacre (1937–1938) under Japanese occupation.

== Biography ==
=== Early life and education ===
Born in 1883 to William Wilson Mills (1837–1905) and Sarah Edith Ann Smith Mills (1838–1911), Mills grew up in a family with three older brothers, one sister, and a younger sister who died in infancy. He earned his first bachelor's degree from Davidson College in 1903, followed by a second degree at the University of Oxford in 1910. In 1912, he graduated from Columbia Theological Seminary with a Bachelor of Divinity and soon joined the YMCA in China, serving until 1931. From 1933, he worked as a pastor under the Presbyterian Foreign Mission Board.

=== Nanjing and Shanghai ===
In November 1937, as Japanese forces advanced toward Nanjing, Mills became vice-chairman of the International Committee for the Nanking Safety Zone, a civilian protection initiative led by German businessman John Rabe. On November 22, Mills and fellow missionary Miner Searle Bates met with U.S. Consul John M. Paxton aboard the USS Panay to relay a proposal to Japanese authorities a ceasefire, though the effort failed.

After Nanjing fell on December 13, 1937, Mills actively documented Japanese atrocities. From January to March 1938, he sent harrowing accounts of massacres, rapes, and looting to his wife, Harriet Cornelia Seyle Mills, from his residence at 65 Mochou Road. He also protested directly to the Japanese Embassy, demanding restraint from military personnel.

Following John Rabe's departure in February 1938, Mills assumed chairmanship of the reorganized Nanking International Relief Committee, advocating for humanitarian aid. On April 13, 1938, he petitioned Japanese Consul-General Hidaka Shinrokurō to allow farmers access to rice seeds to prevent famine.

After the Pearl Harbor attack in 1941, Mills was interned by Japanese forces in a Shanghai prison camp until his repatriation in 1943. He returned to China in 1944, working in Chongqing and Shanghai before leaving permanently in 1949. He continued his work in New York City on the staff of the Missionary Research Library at Union Theological Seminary until 1955.

He died in New York City on February 26, 1959, and was buried at Quaker Cemetery in Camden, South Carolina.

== Family ==
Wilson Mills had a daughter, Harriet Cornelia Mills, who was a scholar and professor of Chinese language and literature.
