= Librairie Avant-Garde (Mount Wutai Branch) =

Bookstore in Nanjing, China

Coordinates: 32°3′2″N 118°46′24″E

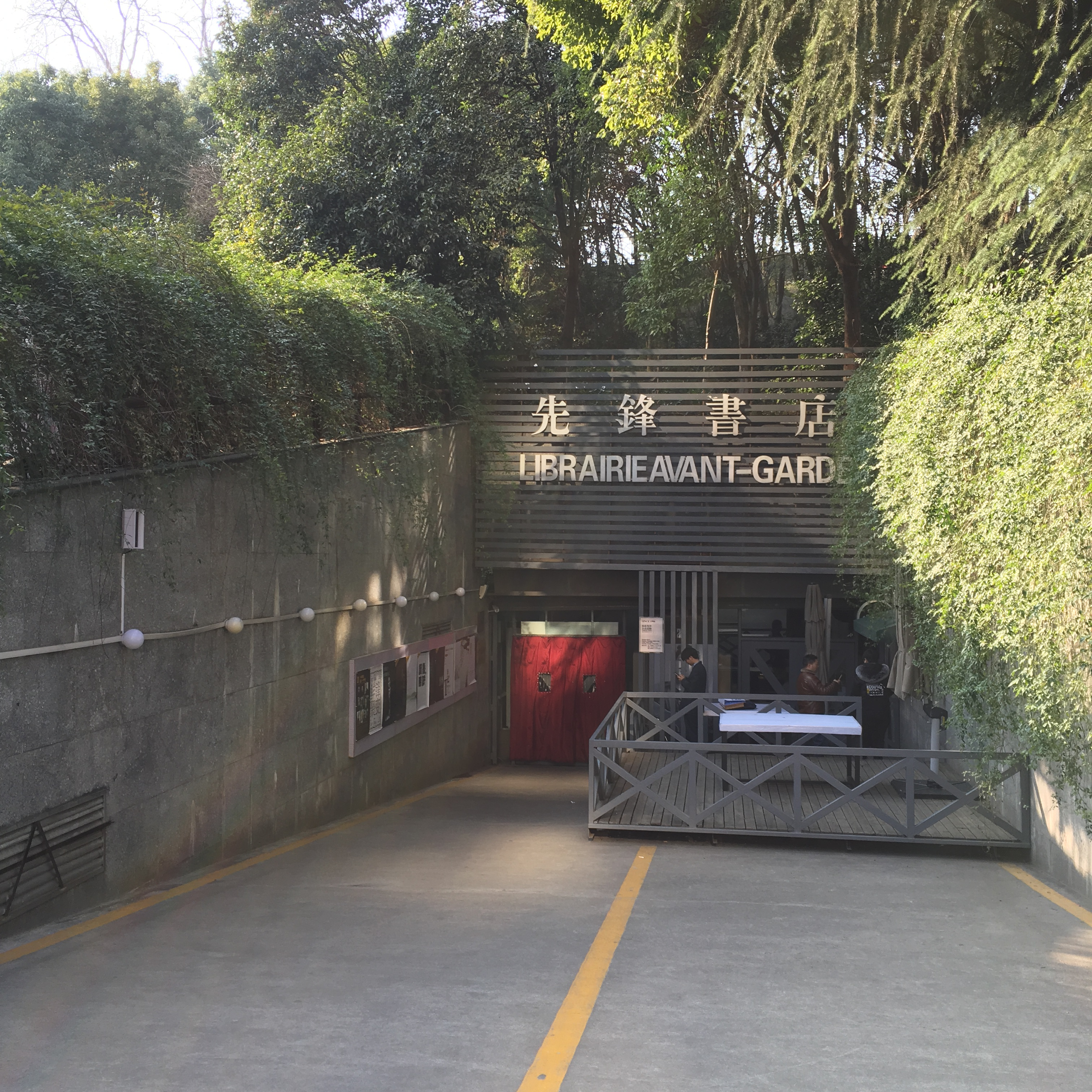
- The bookstore is housed in an underground parking lot on Guangzhou Road in Nanjing, China.
- Genre: Bookstore
- Founded: November 1996 in Nanjing, China
- Founder: Qian Xiaohua
- Headquarters: Nanjing, People's Republic of China
- Products: books, handmade accessories, postcards, bags, notebooks
- Website: http://weibo.com/nanjingxianfeng?is_hot=1 https://site.douban.com/bookshop/

Librairie Avant-Garde (Mount Wutai Branch) is a bookstore opened by Qian Xiaohua in 2004, now regarded as the most representative bookstore in Nanjing, China. It has become a cultural icon of the city, and because of the adjacency to Nanjing University and the popularity among students, it is dubbed as "the second library of Nanjing University".

The bookshop is hidden in a former government parking lot underneath Wutaishan Stadium, which has been used as a bomb shelter. Covering 3780 sq meter, it provides a large volume of social science and humanities books that have been recognized by the literati and history, ranging from literature, history, philosophy, movie, music, photography, dance, drama, architecture, art, cartoons and advertising, to social science, business and journalism, while excluding reference work and other practical books.

Librairie Avant-Garde was listed as one of the world's most beautiful independent bookstores, listed by BBC in 2014. Also rated as the most beautiful bookstore in China by CNN in 2015, and in August, was listed in the coolest bookstores in the world. The Librairie Avant-Garde is among the list 10 of the best industrial-chic spaces worldwide listed by The Guardian in 2016.

== Founding ==
After all the hardship of running the bookstore, bankruptcy in 2003 and the unpredictable, Qian Xiaohua restored energy and opened a flagship bookstore in an underground parking lot, on Guangzhou Road. Because at the time most friends of Qian were avant-garde writers, and he himself was an avid French literature lover, he named the bookstore Librairie Avant-Garde, in which Librairie is a French word that means bookshop. He hoped the bookstore could serve as a spiritual guide for the people making their way in darkness. "A good bookshop should provide space, vision and nurture the city with its humanitarian spirit," owner Qian Xiaohua tells CNN. "It's a place for people to have dreams in the city."

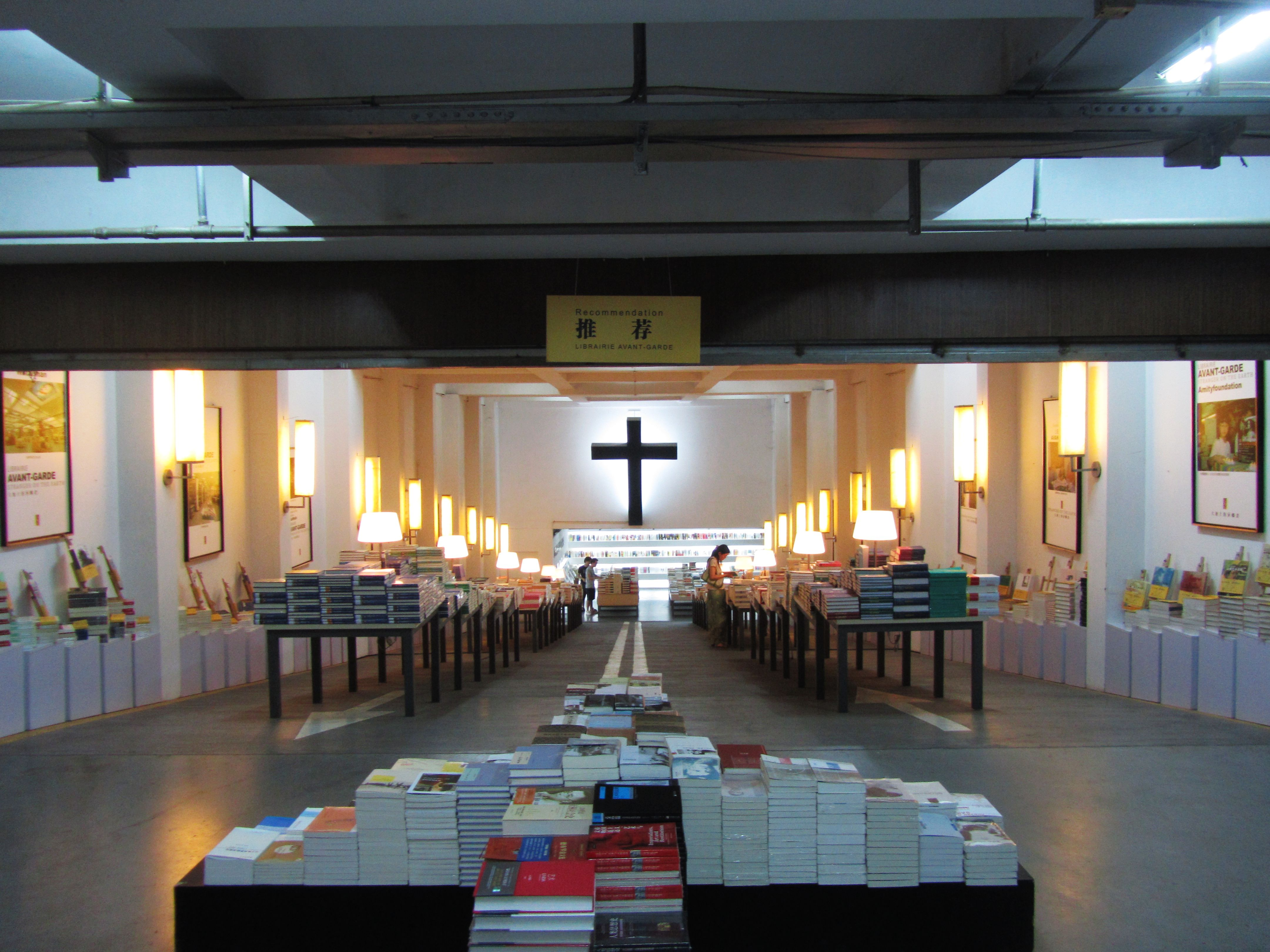
Inside Librairie Avant-Garde

== Chronology ==
- 1996: predecessor of Librairie Avant-Garde opened on Taiping South Road, across the road from St. Paul's Church, Nanjing, with a total area of mere 17 sq meter.
- 1999: moved to No.79, Guangzhou Road, next to the children's hospital, covering 97 sq meter.
- 2001: moved to No.12, Guangzhou Road, covering 600 sq meter.
- 2003: the first metro bookstore in Nanjing opened, at Xinjiekou Station. Confucius temple Branch opened.
- 2004: Mount Wutai Branch opened.
- 2006: New City Square Branch opened.
- 2011: Presidential Palace Branch opened.
- 2012: Wuxi Branch opened.
- 2013: May-ling Branch and Pioneer New Life Press opened.
- 2014: Lingyuan Road Branch(先锋永丰诗舍), Bishan Book Bureau and Runze Press opened.
- 2015: Jiangsu Road Branch, Yihe Academy and Yunxi Library opened.
- 2016: Laoqian Studio and Laomen East Branch opened.

== Other branches ==
- Pioneer Literature&History Bookstore(Presidential Palace, No.292, Yangtze River Road, Nanjing, Jiangsu, China)
- Pioneer Republic of China Academy( Xijia Building, Presidential Palace, No.292, Yangtze River Road, Nanjing, Jiangsu, China)
- Pioneer Literature&History Bookstore(May-ling Palace, Sun Yat-sen Mausoleum, Nanjing, Jiangsu, China)
- Pioneer New Life Press(Nanjing Museum, No.321, Zhongshan East Road, Nanjing, Jiangsu, China)
- Librairie Avant-Garde(Lingyuan Road, Nanjing, Jiangsu, China)
- Pioneer Runze Press(No.86, Yushan West Road, Nanjing, Jiangsu, China)
- Pioneer Yihe Academy(No.39, Jiangsu Road, Nanjing, Jiangsu, China)
- Librairie Avant-Garde(Wuxi Branch)(No.186, Huishan Straight Street, Wuxi, Jiangsu, China)
- Bishan Book Bureau(Qitai Hall, Anhui, China)
- Pioneer Yunxi Library(No.7, Mount Daijia, Zhejiang, China)
- Laoqian Studio(No.189, Guangzhou Road, Nanjing, Jiangsu, China)
- Librairie Avant-Garde(Laomen East Branch)(Bianying No.2, Nanjing, Jiangsu, China)

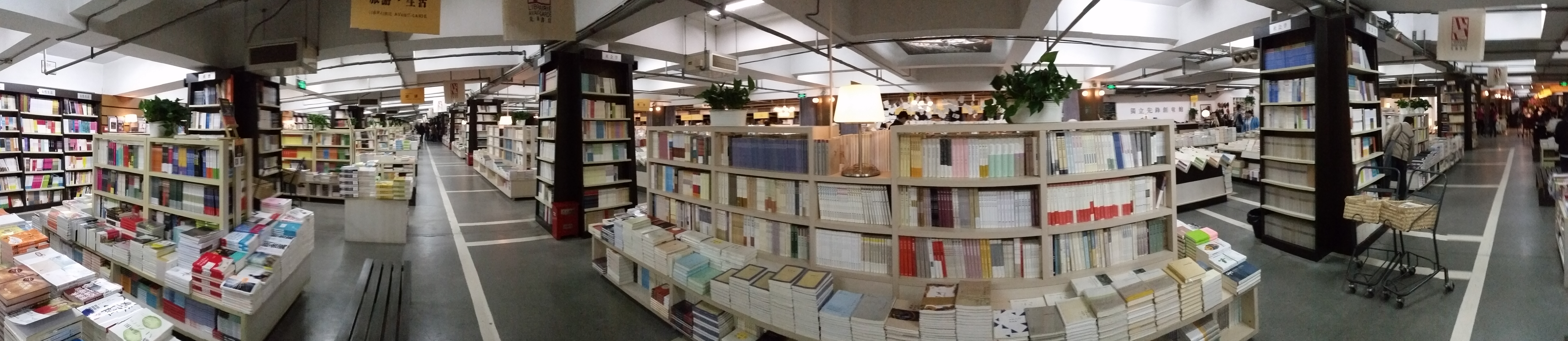
Panoramic view inside Librairie Avant-Garde
