= James Henry McCallum =

American missionary

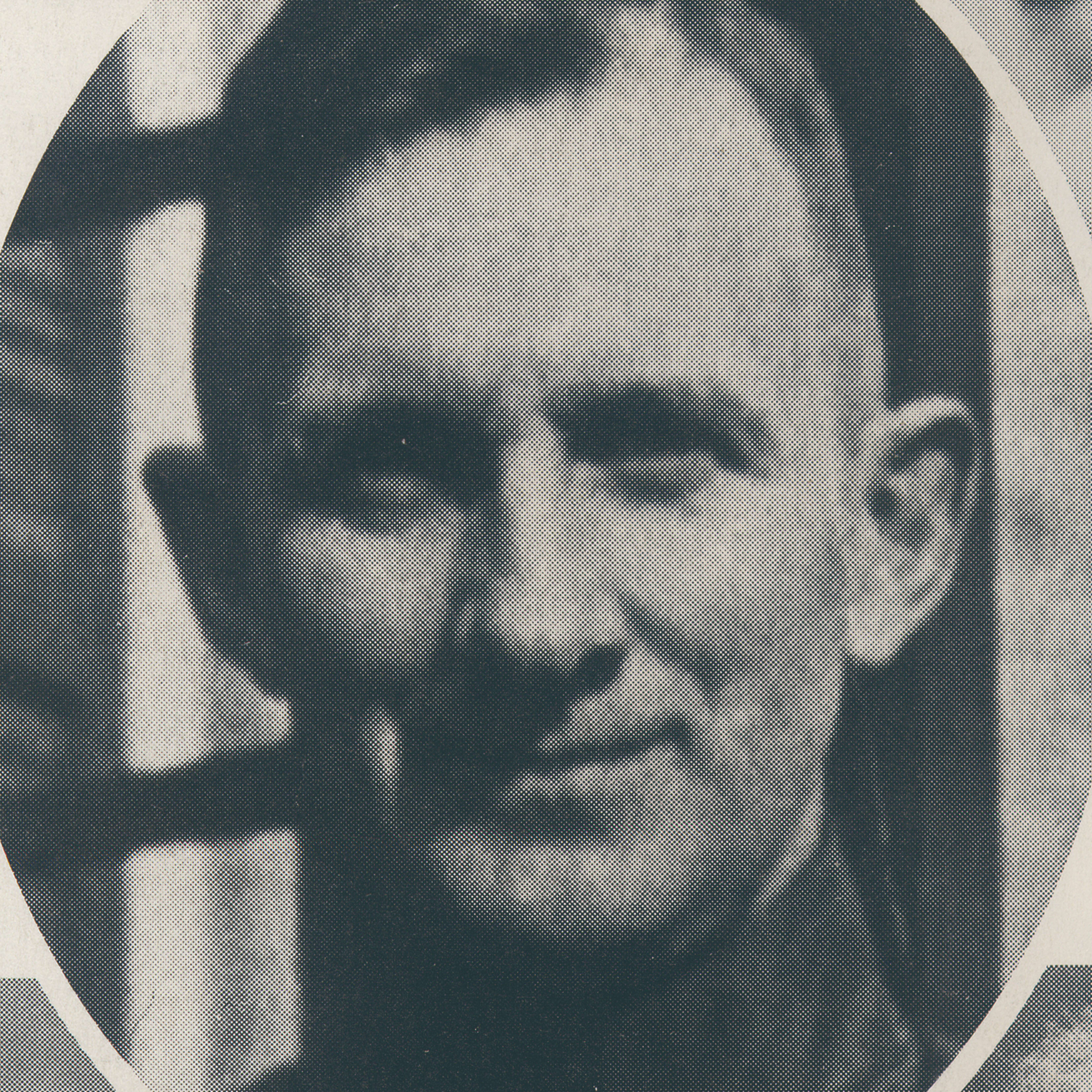
James Henry Macallum

James Henry McCallum (November 19, 1893 – April 20, 1984, Chinese: 詹姆斯·亨利·麦克伦) was an American missionary affiliated with the Church of Christ. During the Nanking Massacre, he was a member of the International Red Cross Committee of Nanking. He held the position of Secretary General of the International Relief Committee in Nanking from July 1938 until April 1939.

== Biography ==
Born in Olympia, Washington, in 1893, he graduated from the University of Oregon in 1917, obtained a B.A. from Yale Divinity School in 1921, and subsequently earned an M.Div. from Chicago Theological Seminary. During a vacation, he also sought a Ph.D. at Concordia Theological Seminary in New York. In 1921, he wed Eva Anderson from Philadelphia, and, dispatched by the Foreign Christian Missionary Society, the couple journeyed to Nanjing, China, and traversed the provinces of Anhui and Jiangxi as missionaries.

During the Nanjing Massacre, McCollum's family sought sanctuary in Jiangxi, but McCollum remained in Nanjing, overseeing the Gulou Hospital and coordinating refugee relief efforts, in addition to serving on the International Red Cross Committee of Nanking. In July 1938, Lewis S. C. Smythe resigned as Secretary General of the International Relief Committee in Nanjing, and McCollum succeeded him, departing from his position in April 1939. From December 19, 1937, to January 1938, McCollum and his family journeyed to China. Correspondence between McCollum and his family from December 19, 1937, to January 15, 1938, served as evidence at the International Military Tribunal for the Far East.

He coordinated rehabilitation efforts in Nanjing from 1946 to 1951, along with the evacuation and relocation of assets during the Christ Church Mission's withdrawal from China due to the Korean War. McCallum died in Pico Rivera, California in 1984.

A copy of McCollum's diary was found in Shanghai in 1995 and later released in Chinese language.
