= James McCallum =

James McCallum may refer to:

- James McCallum (cyclist) (born 1979), Scottish racing cyclist
- James McCallum (politician) (1806–1889), American Confederate politician
- James Henry McCallum (1893–1984), American missionary
- James Scott McCallum (born 1950), American businessman and former governor of Wisconsin
- James McCallum (died 2025), guitarist with The Chefs

== See also ==
- James MacCallum (1860–1943), Canadian ophthalmologist and art collector
