= Ernest Forster =

American Christian missionary to China (1896–1971)

Ernest Herman Forster
- Born: November 1, 1896; Bridesburg, Pennsylvania, U.S.
- Died: December 18, 1971 (aged 75); New Haven, Connecticut, U.S.
- Other names: Chinese: 傅师德, 欧内斯特·福斯特
- Education: Princeton University (1917)
- Occupations: Episcopal missionary, pastor
- Known for: Secretary-General, International Red Cross Committee of Nanking (1937–1938) and Secretary, Nanking International Relief Committee (1938–1939) during the Nanjing Massacre
- Spouse: Clarissa Townsend (m. 1936)

Religious life
- Religion: Episcopal
- Church: St. Paul's Church, Nanjing, Christ Episcopal Church, Smithfield

Ernest Herman Forster (November 1, 1896 – December 18, 1971, Chinese: 傅师德, 欧内斯特·福斯特), was an American Episcopal missionary. He held the position of secretary-general of the International Red Cross Committee of Nanking during the Nanjing Massacre.

== Biography ==
Ernest Forster, born in Bridesburg, Pennsylvania in 1895, graduated from Princeton University in 1917. He served as an assistant at St. Paul's School in Baltimore for two years before being dispatched by the Episcopal Church to China as a missionary in 1920, where he taught at Mahan School in Yangzhou. In 1936, he wed Clarissa Townsend in Boston, after which the couple returned to Yangzhou.

A month prior to the Nanjing Massacre, Ernest and Clarissa Forster arrived in Nanjing to assume the roles of pastors at St. Paul's Church, Nanjing. Clarissa subsequently journeyed to Hankou at the end of November, reaching Shanghai via Hong Kong in mid-January of the subsequent year. Ernest Forster, alongside John Gillespie Magee, held the position of Secretary General of the Nanjing Committee of the International Red Cross. In July 1938, Ernest Forster succeeded Lewis S. C. Smythe as Secretary of the Nanking International Relief Committee, and in April 1939, he departed from Nanjing.

In 1942, Forster returned to the United States along with 13 other missionaries under terms arranged by the Japanese occupying forces in Shanghai. Upon returning, he worked as a chaplain at Virginia Episcopal School in Lynchburg, Virginia, and as priest at Christ Episcopal Church, Smithfield.

Following a stroke in 1971, Forster died at home in New Haven, Connecticut, on December 18, 1971.
