= Christian Kröger =

Christian Jakob Kröger (February 5, 1903 - March 21, 1993, Chinese: 克勒格尔), was a German engineer employed by the German-owned Carlowitz & Co. During the Nanjing Massacre, he served as the treasurer of the International Committee for the Nanking Safety Zone and as the accountant for the International Red Cross Committee of Nanking.

== Biography ==
Born on February 5, 1903, in Altona, Hamburg, Germany, as the eldest of three children of a wagon driver, he graduated from the Higher School of Mechanics in Hamburg in 1923 and became an engineer in the export trade. In July 1928, he commenced employment in China with Rehmann & Co., which included Krupp among its shareholders. He returned to Germany for a vacation in 1936 and subsequently resided in Taiyuan. Upon returning from Germany, Kröger commenced employment in Nanjing, where he encountered his future first wife, the German Erika Busser, who was born in Yantai, China.

Kröger resided for an extended period in the offices of Carlowitz at 244 Zhongshan North Road in Nanking. Upon the establishment of the International Committee for the Nanking Safety Zone on November 29, 1937, Kröger was appointed as a member and treasurer. Prior to the Japanese occupation of Nanking, Carlowitz was entirely evacuated, with Kröger remaining as the backup custodian of all correspondence received by the company in Nanking thereafter. Alongside John Rabe, Kröger enumerated the German assets pillaged by the Japanese at Nanking, which included Kröger's personal possessions, such as a Zeiss-Ikon 6×9 camera that was located in the vehicle. On December 22, 1937, Kröger and another security personnel, Commissioner Hatz, were assaulted by Japanese forces while attending to a Chinese individual who had sustained a knife wound to the neck inflicted by a Japanese soldier. Hartz defended himself with a chair while being restrained to the ground by the Japanese soldiers. The two subsequently escaped the scene, encountering John Rabe en route, who provided assistance. John Rabe subsequently returned them to the location and reconstructed the events.

On January 13, 1938, Kröger finalized his report, Days and Nights of the Nanking Crucifixion, detailing the supply deliveries and the damage to the safety zone. On January 16, Kröger received authorization to travel to Shanghai, becoming the first foreigner allowed to depart Nanking. He departed for Shanghai on January 23, 1938, where he informed the international press about the Nanjing Massacre. Two weeks later, he departed for Hong Kong and returned to China in January 1939. On March 22, 1939, the German ambassador to China, Oskar Trautmann, dispatched a letter of gratitude to Kröger from Hankow via the Hong Kong Carowitz Company, commending the humanitarian spirit he exhibited in Nanjing while serving as a member of the International Committee for the Nanking Safety Zone, a spirit that conferred honor upon Germany.

During the International Military Tribunal for the Far East, an anonymous letter from Germany detailing the Japanese atrocities in Nanking was allegedly authored by Kröger, who obtained a non-Nazi certificate from the British occupying forces on September 27, 1948. He, along with his family, continued to work for Krupp in Cairo, Egypt, from 1950 until his wife's demise on January 31, 1956, and subsequently in Munich on July 20, 1957. Kröger wed his second spouse, Anna Friedrich, in Munich on July 20, 1957. From 1958 to 1962, Kröger was employed in Tehran, Iran, before retiring in 1963 and returning to Germany, where he resided in a tiny village in Lower Saxony.

Due to his remembrance of the events, Kröger retyped his report in 1986 and sent a copy to Guo Fengmin, the ambassador of China to Germany. This was a time when little was known of the Nanking Massacre, as John Rabe's diary as well as further books on the subject had not been published yet. Kröger died on March 21, 1993.
