= Harriet Mills =

Harriet Mills may refer to:

- Harriet Cornelia Mills (1920–2016), China scholar
- Harriet May Mills (1857–1935), civil rights leader
