= Clifford Sharp Trimmer =

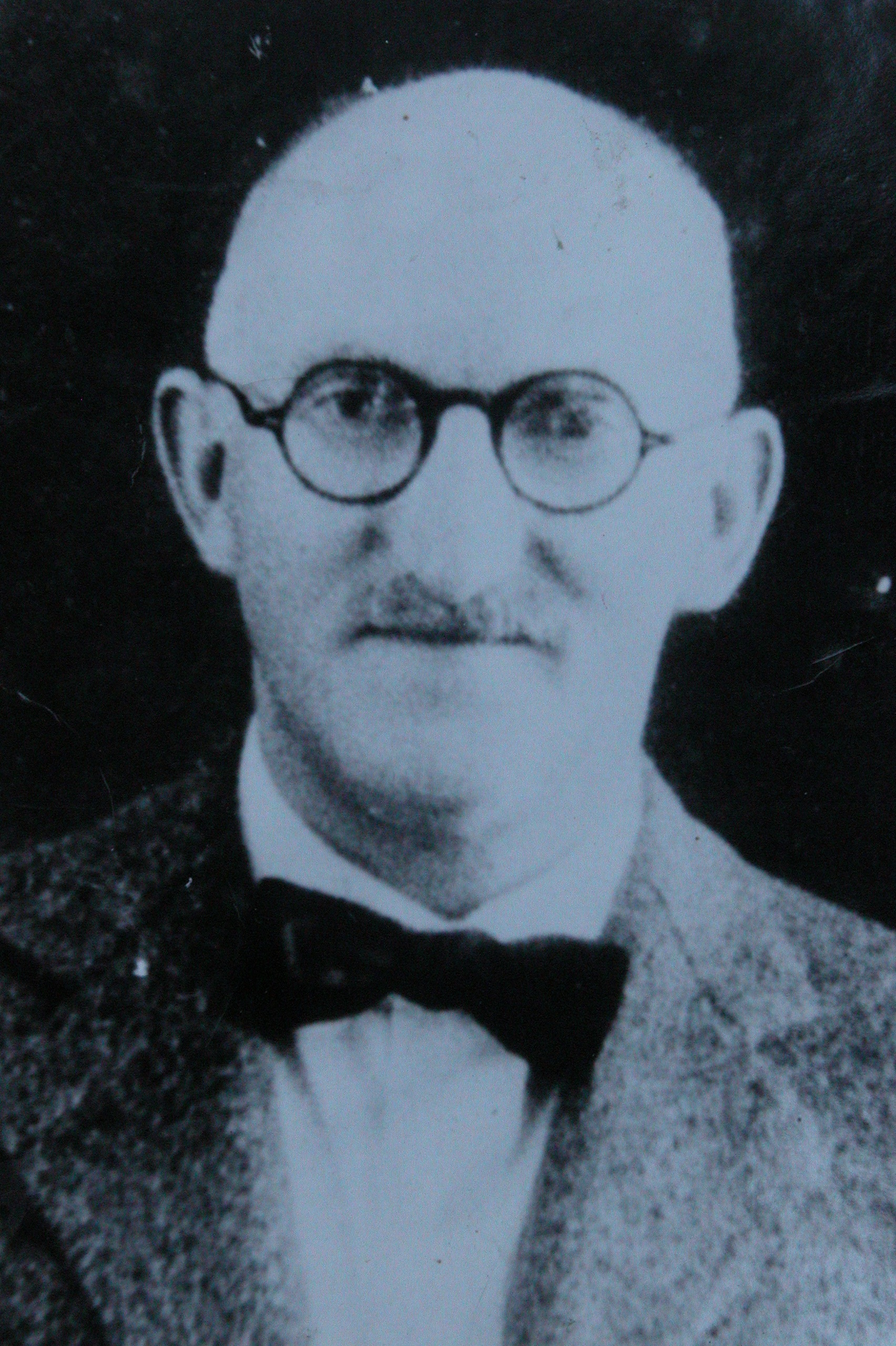
Clifford Sharp Trimmer

Clifford Sharp Trimmer (February 5, 1891 – January 8, 1974, Chinese: 特里默), or CS Trimmer (Chinese: 屈穆尔), was an American doctor and a member of Methodist Episcopal Church.

== Biography ==
Clifford was born in Middle Valley, New Jersey. At the time of his birth, his father, Morris Sharp Trimmer, was 32 years old, and his mother, Mary Elizabeth Dufford, was 33 years old. Clifford obtained his degree from Lafayette College, Pennsylvania, in 1913, and earned his M.D. in 1918 from the University of Pennsylvania.

He arrived in China and served as an internist at Gulou Hospital (Drum Tower Hospital) then. During the Second Congress of the Chinese Medical Association in Nanjing at the end of March 1934, Muer was a member of the hospitality team. In August 1937, he assumed the position of head of the Department of Internal Medicine and Radiology at Gulou Hospital. On November 29th, he participated as a member of the International Committee for the Nanking Safety Zone during the Nanjing Massacre. He became one of the few internists who remained at Gulou Hospital during the Nanking Massacre and has been providing patient care there ever since, as a member of International Red Cross Committee of Nanking.

Subsequent to the commencement of the Pacific War, he was detained by the Japanese and released to the United States in 1943. He held the position of prison doctor in Pennsylvania from May 1943 to October 1944 and thereafter worked as a US Navy port doctor from November 1944 to August 1946. He resumed his position at Gulou Hospital in the autumn 1946 and departed from China in November 1950. He moved to Lahore, Pakistan, in 1952 to practice medicine at the Church Hospital, where he continued until his retirement in 1959.

He died on January 8, 1974, in Montclair, New Jersey, and was interred in Califon, New Jersey.
