= Eduard Sperling (businessman) =

German businessman who lived in China

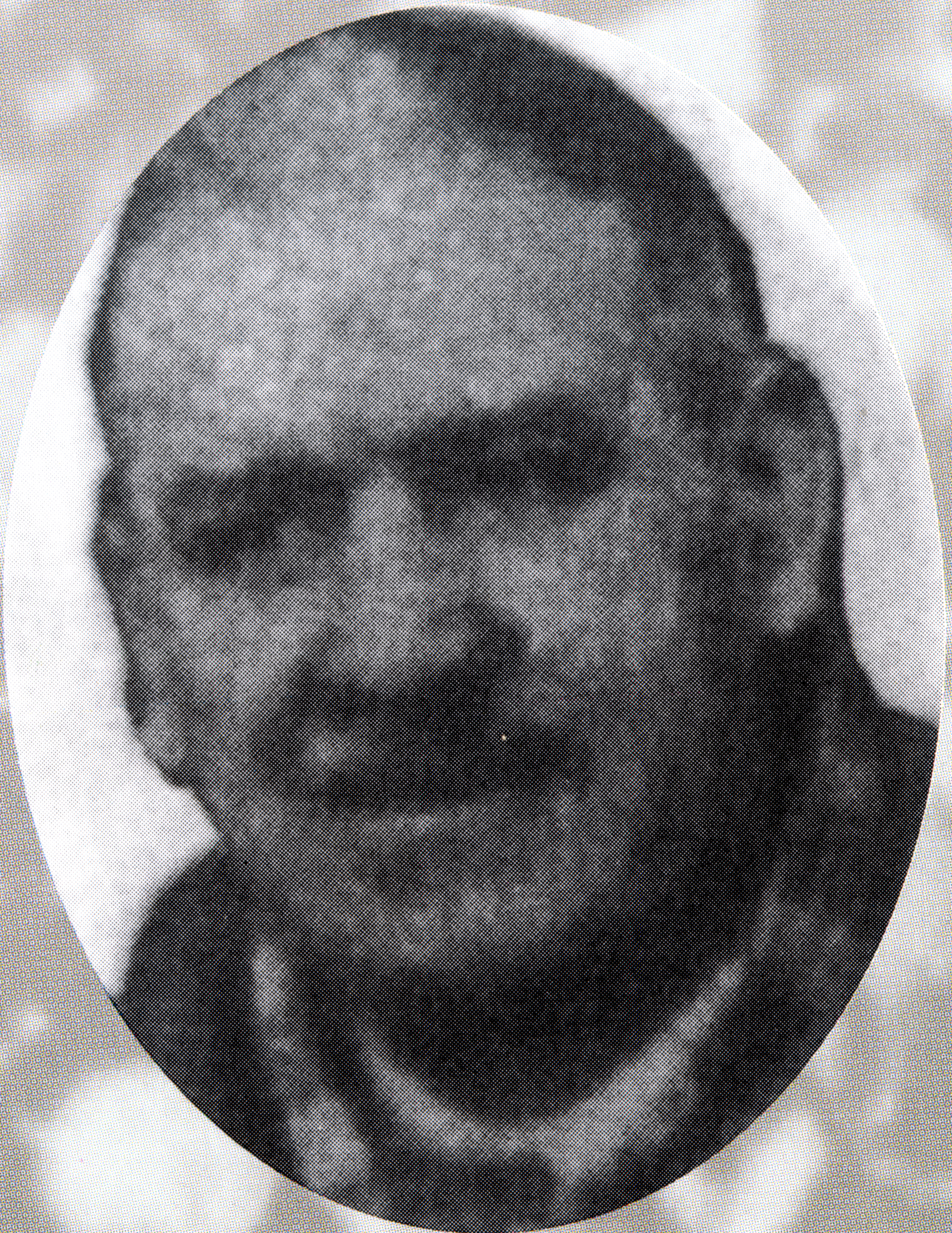
- Born: 1870; Germany
- Died: Unknown
- Occupation: Businessman
- Known for: Member of the International Committee for the Nanking Safety Zone

Eduard Sperling (Chinese: 爱德华·史波林, 施佩林) was a German businessman that was based in China in the 1930s. He was a representative of the Shanghai Insurance Company in Nanjing and a member of the Nazi Party. He was best known for being a member of the International Committee for the Nanking Safety Zone to help citizens during the Nanjing Massacre.

== Early life ==
Eduard Sperling served in the German military during World War I, and engaged in the Siege of Tsingtao, apprehended by the Japanese, and was detained in Japan for four years.

== Japanese invasion ==
During the Nanking Massacre, he served as a member of the International Committee for the Nanking Safety Zone and held the position of General Inspector. As a member of the Nazi Party, Spolin denounced the Japanese forces while exclaiming "Heil Hitler" to intimidate them, and protect Chinese refugees. In February 1938, he received treatment for a cold from Jin Yongpan and thereafter traveled to the Shanghai International Settlement to assist Jin in submitting his report of Nanjing Massacre to the Nationalist Government.
