= Paul Hector Munro-Faure =

British military officer (1894–1956)

Paul Hector Munro-Faure (1894–1956), or P. H. Munro-Faure (Chinese: 芒罗·福勒), was a British military officer and entrepreneur.

== Early life ==
Hector resided in Aldenham, Hertfordshire until 1911 and graduated from Aldenham School Contingent, O.T.C. His father was Paul-Jules Faure.

He joined the British Army Reserve Corps on January 27, 1912, was elevated to the rank of lieutenant on August 6, 1914, and participated in World War I. He served with the 1st and 2nd Battalions Nottinghamshire and Derbyshire Regiment (Sherwood Foresters) from 1915 to 1916, and in Africa with the King's African Rifles as a Captain from 1917 to 1918.

== Career ==
From 1919, he was employed by the Asiatic Petroleum Company, traversing China. He served as branch manager in Nanking in 1937. Paul was a member of the International Committee for the Nanking Safety Zone upon its establishment on November 29, 1937. He left the city in early December at the behest of the Asiatic Petroleum Company, and was not present for the Nanking Massacre. Subsequently, he contributed to the formation of the Refugee Safety Zone in Shanghai.

Following the commencement of the Pacific War, Fowler re-enlisted in May 1941 as a major and was subsequently promoted to lieutenant colonel in the Special Operations Department of the British Army. He was stationed at the Maymyo Bush Warfare School from July to December 1941 and instructed Chinese guerrillas in Burma from 1942 to June 1943. On June 17, 1943, he was elevated to the rank of Colonel of Special Operations Executive and functioned as a military liaison officer in Kunming. He departed from Special Operations Executive in August 1944 to return to the United Kingdom.

He was sent to the British Embassy in Romania as oil attaché in 1945.

He retired in 1949 and died in London in 1956.

== Personal life ==
He married Marion Beatrice Blackburn in 1922 and fathered two boys.
