= Harriet Cornelia Mills =

Harriet Cornelia Mills (2 April 1920 – 5 March 2016) was a scholar and professor of Chinese language and literature at the University of Michigan from 1966 to 1990. In 1951, she was arrested by the government of the People's Republic of China and held until October, 1955 on charges of spying. On her release she told the western press that she was guilty.

== Biography ==
Harriet C. Mills was born in Tokyo, where her parents were Presbyterian American missionaries, Wilson Plumer Mills and Cornelia Mills (née Seyle). She was taken to Hankou as an infant and attended American primary and secondary schools in Nanjing and Shanghai. Mills completed undergraduate Studies at Wellesley College and graduate studies at Columbia University, where she got a PhD degree in Chinese in 1963, with a thesis titled Lu Hsün: 1927–1936, the years on the left.

In 1947, Mills went to China on a Fulbright Scholarship, studying and doing research on Lu Xun. She also assisted Dorothy Borg, who taught European history at Peking University, and taught classes herself. After the beginning of the Korean War, Mills and other US Americans tried to leave China but were denied exit visas.

Mills was arrested in July 1951 at the same time as several other foreigners, including Antonio Riva, Ruichi Yamaguchi, W. Allyn and Adele Rickett. Chinese friends such as Wang Tieya later also faced repression because of associating with her. She was accused of possessing an illegal radio and being a spy. In October 1955, Mills was released via Hong Kong. After her release, she said in front of the press in Hong Kong that she had "engaged in activities against the Chinese people." She told reporters: "The communists have a perfect right to arrest me. … I confessed from the very day I was arrested." She said she had confessed passing on information to British and US diplomats, stressing repeatedly she had been "treated with the utmost consideration and courtesy" by her captors and that she had not been tortured. US officials said they could not say whether she had undergone "brainwashing treatment". The CIA indirectly assigned Bill Thetford to escort her back to the US and to debrief her.

She later told a group of students at University of Michigan how she gradually came to identify with her captors. A major reason for this identification was teaching basic literacy to the women in her cell who had been imprisoned for petty theft, prostitution, or for family connections with the Nationalist Party. Their energy in learning and hope that they might contribute to the new society made her feel guilty for her comfortable life and for remarking as a child that she wanted to stay in China because she liked having someone to shine her shoes. The turning point, however, came when she was weak from sleep deprivation and heard that one of her fellow prisoners had confessed.

In 1959, Mills began her teaching career at Columbia University, and in 1960 she became an associate professor of Chinese.

Later in her career, she completed a second MA degree in linguistics at the University of Michigan.

In 1966, Mills became an associate professor of Chinese at the University of Michigan. In 1974, she became professor of Chinese language and Literature at the Department of Far Eastern Languages and Literatures (today the Department of Asian Languages and Cultures). She retired in 1990.

Mills specialized in modern Chinese literature and published a widely used Chinese language textbook.

Mills died at the age of 95. She is survived by her sister Angie.

== Works (selection) ==
=== Books ===
- Intermediate Reader in Modern Chinese, 3 vols. Cornell University Press, 1967 (with P. S. Ni).

=== Articles ===
- "Language Reform in China: Some Recent Developments."The Far Eastern Quarterly vol.15.4 (1 August 1956), pp. 517–540.
- "Reflections on a Missionary Childhood," The China Connection (issue?), pp. 182ff.
- "Thought Reform: Ideological Remolding in China,"Atlantic Monthly December 1959, pp. 71–77.
- "Lu Hsün and the Communist Party," The China Quarterly vol. 4, 1960, pp. 17–27.
- "Group Study in Red China: Brainwashing in Depth," In: Reo Millard Christenson, Robert Owen McWilliams, eds., Voice of the People: Readings in Public Opinion and Propaganda. McGraw-Hill, 1962, pp. 412–414.
- "Literary Dissent in Communist China," (Review) The China Quarterly vol. 34, 1968, pp. 151–152.
- "Lu Xun: Literature and Revolution—from Mara to Marx," In Merle Goldman (ed.): Modern Chinese Literature in the May Fourth Era. Harvard University Press, 1977, pp. 189–220.
- "Literature in Fetters," In: Ross Terrill, ed., The China Difference, Harper & Row, 1979, pp. 285–304.
- "Obituary: Robert Ruhlmann (1920–1984)," The Journal of Asian Studies vol. 44.2 (1 February 1985), pp. 477.

== Sources ==
- Memoir: Harriet C. Mills Regent's Proceedings 269, University of Michigan.
- Sam Roberts: Harriet Mills, 95, scholar held in ‘brainwashing prison’ in China Boston Globe, 3 April 2016.
- Sam Roberts: Harriet Mills, Scholar Held in ‘Brainwashing Prison’ in China, Dies at 95 New York Times, 29 March 2016.
