= Elisabeth Abegg =

German educator and Righteous Among the Nations recipient

- Born: Luise Wilhelmine Elisabeth Abegg; 3 March 1882; Straßburg, Alsace–Lorraine, German Empire
- Died: 8 August 1974 (aged 92); West Berlin, West Germany
- Education: Leipzig University
- Political party: German Democratic Party; Social Democratic Party of Germany
- Parents: Johann Friedrich Abegg (father); Marie Caroline Elisabeth (Rähm) Abegg (mother)
- Honours: Order of Merit of the Federal Republic of Germany; Righteous Among the Nations

Luise Wilhelmine Elisabeth Abegg (German: [eˈliːzabɛt ˈʔaːbɛk]; 3 March 1882 – 8 August 1974) was a German educator and resistance fighter against Nazism. She provided shelter to around 80 Jews during the Holocaust and was consequently recognised as Righteous Among the Nations.

== Biography ==
Abegg was born in 1882 in Strasbourg, then a part of Germany, to Johann Friedrich Abegg, a jurist, and Marie Caroline Elisabeth (Rähm) Abegg. In 1912, she enrolled at Leipzig University, where she studied history, classical philology and Romance studies, and graduated with a doctorate in 1916. She moved to Berlin in 1918 when the Alsace region was reclaimed by France. In Berlin, she became involved in postwar relief work organised by the Quaker community. She became a teacher at the Luisengymnasium Berlin in Berlin-Mitte in 1924 and was an active member of the German Democratic Party.

Abegg openly criticised the Nazi regime after Adolf Hitler assumed power in 1933. She was transferred to another school as punishment for her criticism and was questioned by the Gestapo in 1938. In 1941, she was forced to retire from teaching and officially converted to Quakerism in 1941. She began to help persecuted Jews find safe shelter in 1942. She established an extensive network of rescuers—including her Quaker friends and her former students—to provide accommodation to Jews in hiding. Abegg temporarily housed dozens of Jews in her Tempelhof apartment, which she shared with her mother and disabled sister, and vacant neighbouring apartments, and secured permanent accommodation for them across Berlin, East Prussia and Alsace. She sold her jewelry to pay for some Jews' escape to Switzerland and tutored hiding Jewish children at her apartment. In total, she sheltered around 80 Jews between 1942 and 1945.

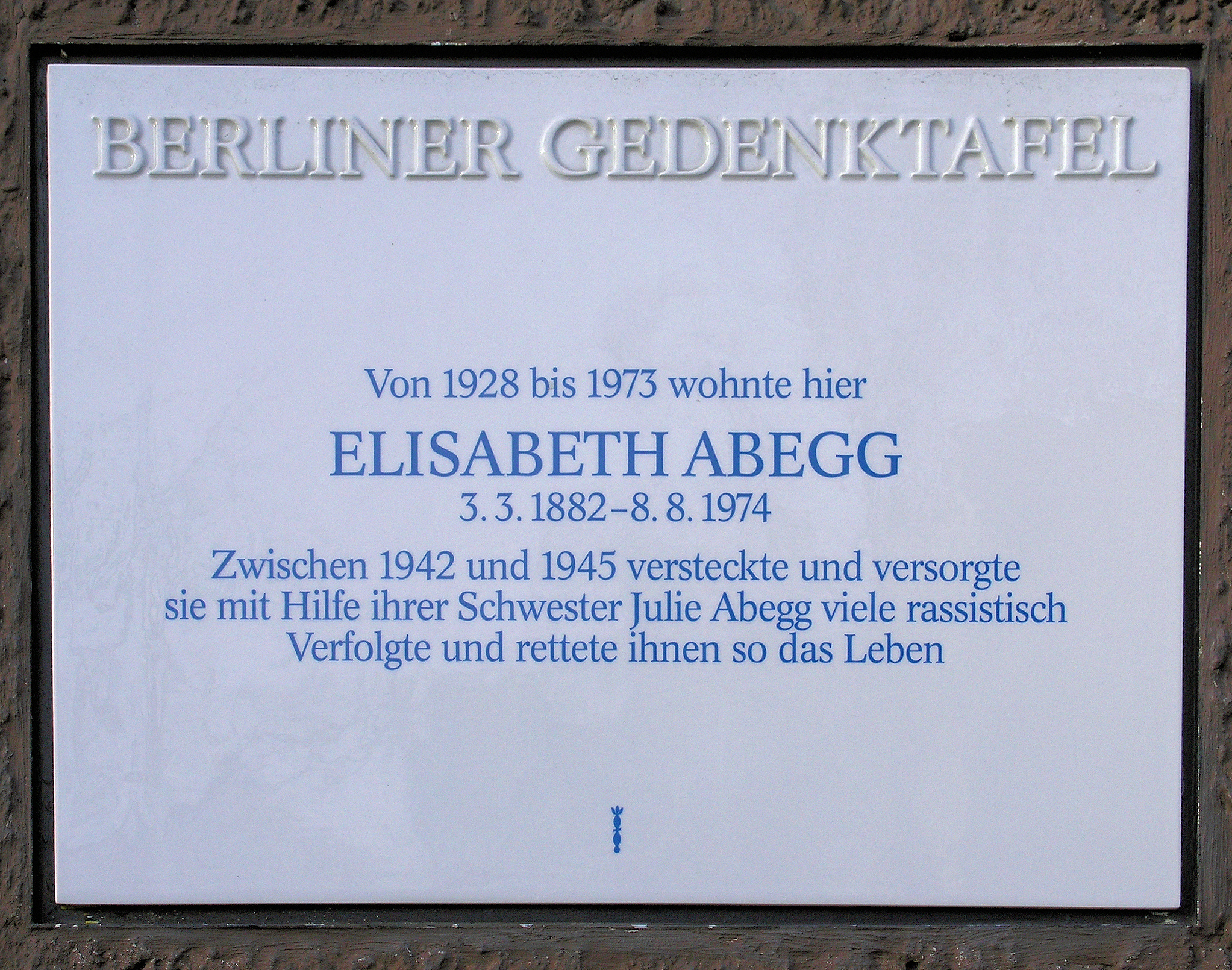
Memorial plaque for Elisabeth Abegg in Tempelhof, Berlin

After the Second World War, Abegg resumed teaching in Berlin. She became a member of the Social Democratic Party of Germany and was active in Quaker groups. In 1957, a group of Jews whom Abegg had rescued during the Holocaust published a book, titled And a Light Shined in the Darkness, in dedication to her. She died in Berlin on 8 August 1974.

== Honours and legacy ==
Abegg received the Order of Merit of the Federal Republic of Germany (Verdienstkreuz am Bande) in 1957. In 1967, she was recognised as Righteous Among the Nations by Yad Vashem. A memorial plaque was mounted in her Tempelhof neighbourhood in 1991 and a street in Berlin's Mitte, Elisabeth-Abegg-Straße, was named after her in 2006.

== Sources ==
- Bernet, Claus (2006). Elisabeth Abegg. In: Biographisch-Bibliographisches Kirchenlexikon (BBKL). Vol. 26, Nordhausen: Bautz, ISBN 3-88309-354-8, Sp. 1–3
- Bender, Sara; Borut, Jakob; Fraenkel, Daniel; Gutman, Israel; eds. (2005). Lexikon der Gerechten unter den Völkern. Deutsche und Österreicher. (tr. Encyclopedia of the Righteous Among the Nations. Germans and Austrians.) Yad Vashem und Wallstein-Verlag, Göttingen, ISBN 978-3-89244-900-3
- Pereles, Liselotte (1984). Die Retterin in der Not. In: Kurt R. Grossmann: Die unbesungenen Helden. Menschen in Deutschlands dunklen Tagen. (tr. "The savior in times of need. In: Kurt R. Grossmann: The unsung heroes. People in Germany's dark days.") Berlin / Wien:Ullstein Verlag, ISBN 978-3-548-33040-2, pp. 85–93.
