= International Committee for the Nanking Safety Zone =

1937 demilitarized zone committee

From left to right: Ernest Forster, Lewis Strong, John Rabe, Casey Smythe, Eduard Sperling, George Fitch

The International Committee was established in 1937 to establish and manage the Nanking Safety Zone.

Many Westerners were living in the city at that time, conducting trade or on missionary trips. As the Imperial Japanese Army began to approach Nanjing (also known as Nanking), most of them fled the city. A small number of Western businessmen, journalists and missionaries, however, chose to remain behind. The missionaries were primarily Americans from the Episcopal, Disciples of Christ, Presbyterian, and Methodist churches. To coordinate their efforts, the Westerners formed a committee: the International Committee for the Nanking Safety Zone.

German businessman John Rabe was elected as its leader, partly because of his status as a member of the Nazi party, and the existence of the German–Japanese bilateral Anti-Comintern Pact. Rabe and other refugees from foreign countries tried to protect the civilians from being killed by the Japanese. The Japanese army did not completely respect the immunity of the Safety Zone and soldiers would sometimes show up under dubious pretenses to take Chinese women and men into custody. There were also kidnappings of women from the Zone. Such people taken into custody would often either be summarily executed or taken away for rape. Due to Rabe's efforts, some 250,000 people were protected during the Nanjing Massacre.

In February 1938, as violence by the Japanese Army abated, the International Committee for the Nanking Safety Zone was reorganized as the Nanking International Relief Committee, which did humanitarian work in Nanjing until at least 1941. There are no records of any activity by the committee after 1941 and it is believed that it was likely forced to discontinue its operations after the United States entered World War II.

== Establishment of the Nanking Safety Zone ==
The Westerners who remained behind established the Nanking Safety Zone, a score of refugee camps bordered by roads on all four sides that occupied an area of about 2 square miles (5.2 km^{2}). This is approximately 1.5 times the size of Central Park in New York.

== Members ==
The fifteen members of the International Committee for the Nanking Safety Zone were as follows:

Name	Nationality / Occupation	Organization
Minnie Vautrin	American missionary	Ginling College
Miner Searle Bates	American professor	University of Nanking
JM Hansen	Danish businessman	Texas Oil Co.
J. Lean	American businessman	Asiatic Petroleum Co.
Iver Mackay	British businessman	Butterfield and Swire
John Magee	American missionary	American Church Mission
Rev. W. Plumer Mills	American missionary	Northern Presbyterian Mission
P. H. Munro-Faure	British businessman	Asiatic Petroleum Co.
J.V. Pickering	American businessman	Standard-Vacuum Co.
John Rabe	German businessman	Siemens Co.
Charles Riggs	American professor	University of Nanking
G. Schultze-Pantin	German businessman	Shingming Trading Co.
P.R. Shields	British businessman	International Export Co.
Lewis S. C. Smythe	American professor	University of Nanking
Eduard Sperling	German businessman	Shanghai Insurance Co.
Dr. CS Trimmer	American doctor	Nanking University Hospital
Dr. George Ashmore Fitch	American	YMCA

George Ashmore Fitch, was general secretary of the "Foreign YMCA" in Shanghai, advisor to OMEA, active in the humanitarian work, named by John Rabe (chairman) to be director of the ICNSZ, and served as acting mayor of Nanjing after Mayor General Ma Shao-chuan turned over to him treasury resources, some police, and food stores. Most lists do not mention him as a formal member. Perhaps this is because he was elected director while he had been travelling and before he returned to Nanjing. These individuals are not to be confused with the members of the International Red Cross Committee of Nanking, which did similar work. Its 17 members included Robert O. Wilson, an American doctor at Drum Tower Hospital of Nanking University Hospital, James McCallum, an American missionary at the same institution, and Minnie Vautrin, an American missionary at Ginling Girls' College.

== Activities ==
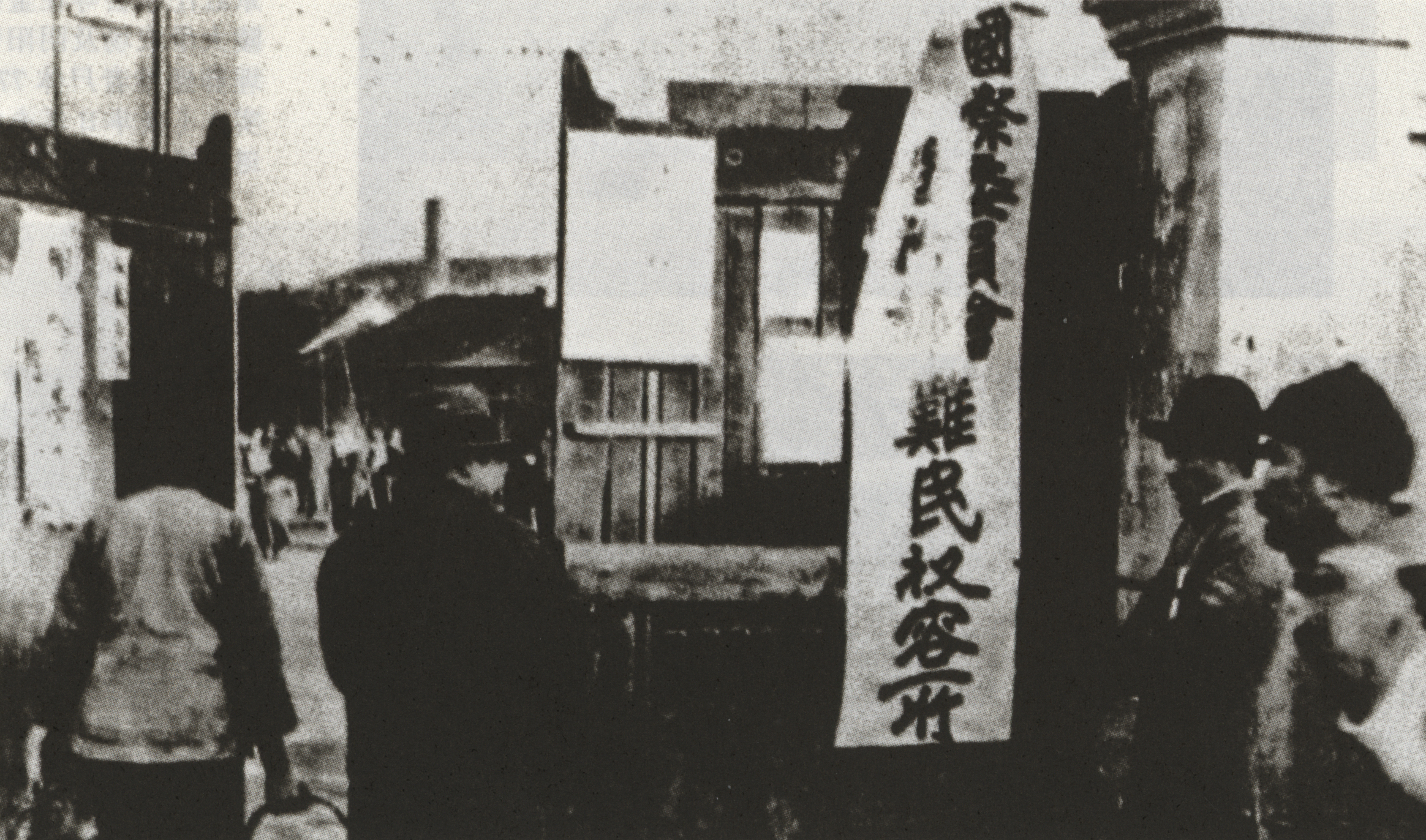
Refugee shelters established by the International Committee for the Nanking Safety Zone in 1937

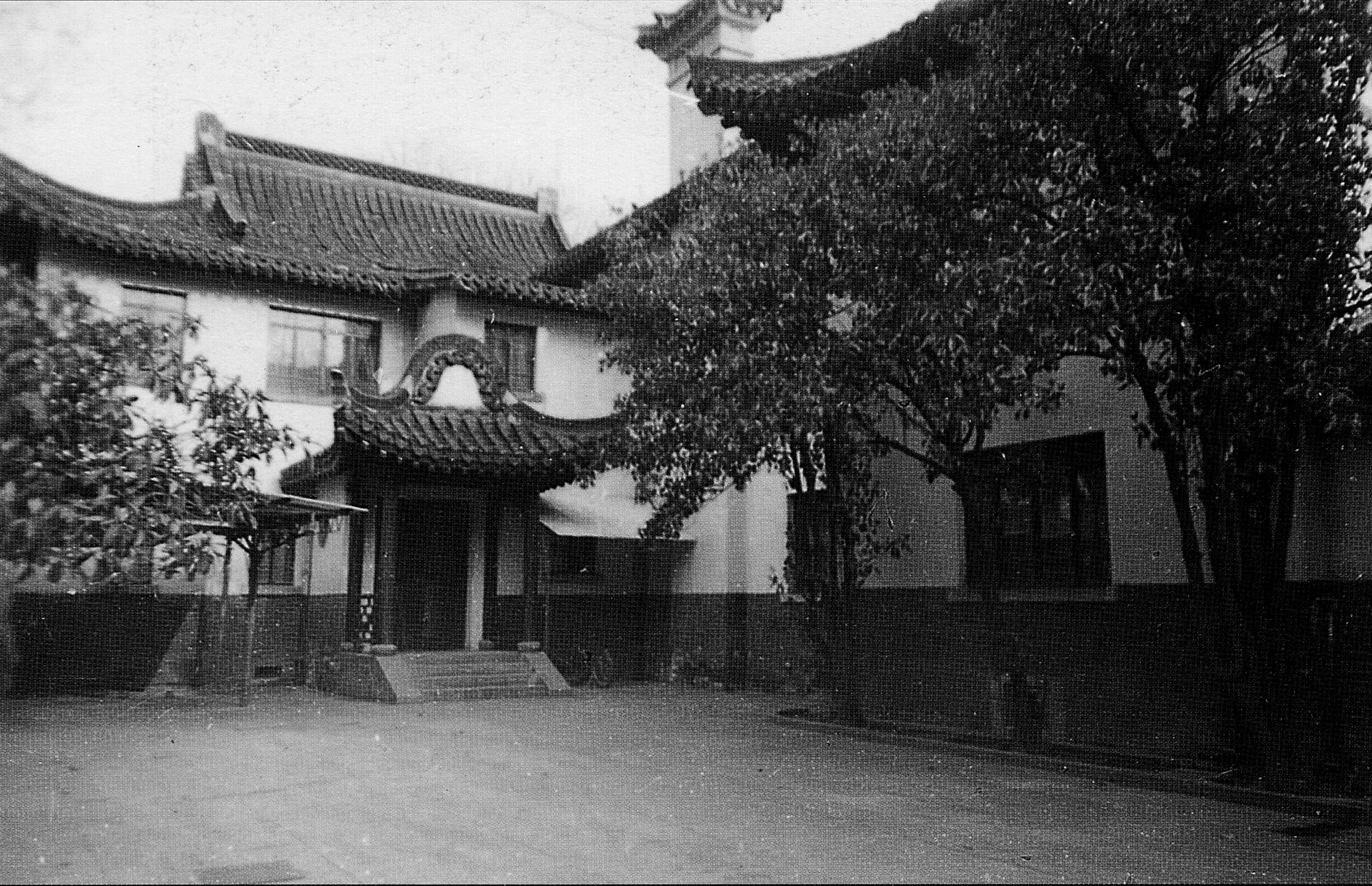
5 Ninghai Road was once the headquarters of the International Committee for the Nanking Safety Zone

When Nanjing fell, the Nanking Safety Zone housed over 250,000 refugees. The committee members of the Zone found ways to provide these refugees with the basic needs of food, shelter, and medical care.

Whenever Japanese soldiers entered the Zone, they were closely shadowed by one of the Westerners. The Westerners repeatedly refused to comply with demands made of them by Japanese Army soldiers, placing themselves between Japanese soldiers and Chinese civilians.

Committee members frequently contacted Consul-General Okazaki Katsuo, Second Secretary (later Acting Consul-General) Fukui Kiyoshi and Attaché Fukuda Tokuyasu to deal with the anarchic situation.

=== M. Searle Bates ===
Miner Searle Bates was one of the leaders of the committee and worked to secure the safety of the population of Nanjing. This task was dangerous and his life was put at risk on many occasions, most notably when he was shoved down a flight of stairs by Japanese military police after inquiring about the fate of a student who had been abducted by Japanese soldiers.

According to the testimony of Bates before the International Military Tribunal for the Far East, he visited the Japanese embassy daily for the next three weeks after first protesting there against Japanese atrocities. He testified that the Japanese authorities appeared to him to be "honestly trying to do what little they could in a bad situation". However, as Bates testified, the embassy officials were themselves terrified by the military and could do nothing except forward these communications through Shanghai to Tokyo.

=== Robert O. Wilson ===
Along with John Rabe and Minnie Vautrin, Robert O. Wilson was instrumental in the establishment of the Nanking Safety Zone. He was the sole surgeon responsible for treating the victims of the ongoing atrocities. The selfless work of Dr. Wilson and his associates saved the lives of countless civilians and POWs who would have otherwise perished at the hands of the aggressors.

== Role in documenting the Nanjing Massacre ==
Several eyewitness accounts of the Nanjing Massacre were provided by members of the committee.

=== Protests to the Japanese Consulate ===
The committee sent 61 letters to the Japanese Consulate which report various incidents which occurred during the period starting Dec 13, 1937 to Feb 9, 1938.

These letters are quoted in H.J. Timperley's book “What war means: Japanese terror in China:” (Compiled and edited by H.J. Timperley / Victor Gollancz, July 1938).

=== Other documents ===
M. Searle Bates, John Magee and George Ashmore Fitch, the head of YMCA at Nanjing, actively wrote of the chaotic conditions created by the Japanese troops, mimeographed or retyped their stories over and over and sent them to their friends, government officials, and Christian organizations so as to let the world, especially the American public, know what was going on in the terrorized city.

They hoped that the U. S. government would intervene, or at least apply the Neutrality Act of 1937 to the "China Incident," which would have made it illegal for any American business to sell war materials to Japan.

For example, a letter of Searle Bates to the American Consul in January 1938 explained how the Safety Zone had been "tenaciously maintained" and needed help "amid dishonor by soldiers, murdering, wounding, wholesale raping, resulting in violent terror."

In the United States, the committee on the Far East of the Foreign Missions Conference received scores of letters from missionaries in Nanjing. After weeks of consideration, they decided to release the letters in February 1938 despite the possible adverse effect on the Christian movement in Japan, which led to the eventual publication of their letters in some magazines such as Reader's Digest in mid-1938.

=== Magee films ===
George A. Fitch succeeded in smuggling the films shot by John Magee out of China when he temporarily left the country in January 1938. That year he traveled throughout the United States, giving speeches about what he witnessed in Nanjing along with the films that showed haunting images of Chinese victims.

== Testimony before the International Military Tribunal for the Far East ==
Several members of the committee took the witness stand to testify about their experiences and observations during the Nanjing Massacre. These included Robert Wilson, Miner Searle Bates and John Magee. George A. Fitch, Lewis Smythe and James McCallum filed affidavits with their diaries and letters.

== Historiography ==
During the Korean War (1950–53), the government of the People's Republic of China used records of the International Committee to portray its members as part of a propaganda campaign to arouse patriotic anti-American fervor. As part of this propaganda campaign, the Westerners who remained in Nanjing were characterized as foreigners who sacrificed Chinese lives in order to protect their property, guided the Japanese troops into the city and collaborated with them to round up prisoners of war in the refugee camps.

As a result of this anti-American propaganda, a detailed study carried out by the researchers at the University of Nanking in 1962 went so far as to assert that Westerners had assisted the Japanese in executing Chinese in Nanjing. The study harshly criticized those foreigners for not having made any effort to prevent the ongoing atrocities.

This erroneous perception of the International Committee was eventually corrected in the 1980s as more historical documents became accessible and more thorough studies were published. Today many of the missionaries' private diaries and letters that meticulously documented the scale and character of the Nanjing Massacre are archived at the Yale Divinity School Library.

== Timeline ==
- 22 November 1937 – The International Committee for the Nanking Safety Zone is organized by a group of foreigners to shelter Chinese refugees.
- 12 December 1937 – Chinese soldiers are ordered to withdraw from Nanjing
- 13 December 1937 – Japanese troops capture Nanjing
- 14 December 1937 – The International Committee for the Nanking Safety Zone lodges the first protest letter against Japanese atrocities with the Japanese Embassy.
- 19 February 1938 – The last of the 69 protest letters against Japanese atrocities is sent by the Safety Zone Committee to the Japanese Embassy and announces the renaming of the committee as the Nanking International Relief Committee.

== See also ==
- Nanjing International Red Cross Committee
- Nanking (1937－1945)

== Sources ==
- MacInnis, Donald (2001). Eyewitness to Massacre: American Missionaries Bear Witness to Japanese Atrocities in Nanjing. M.E. Sharpe. ISBN 9780765606846.
