= Mary Twinem =

American missionary and schoolteacher

Mary Dorothy Fine Twinem (Chinese: 戴费马利; April 8, 1895 – September 9, 1983) was an American missionary and schoolteacher.

== Biography ==
Twinem was born in Trenton, New Jersey. She obtained a Bachelor of Arts in Religious Education from Hartford College in Connecticut, followed by a Master's degree from New York University. She arrived in China in September 1919 as a Presbyterian missionary, initially stationed in Huaiyuan, Anhui Province, where she wed Paul DeWitt Twinem, an American professor at the University of Jinling, in May 1922; however, Paul succumbed to a protracted illness on September 24, 1923.

Subsequently, she infrequently returned to the United States, but persisted in her teaching at Jinling University and aided Soong Mei-ling in coordinating Christian organizations. On December 17, 1937, she relocated to the Ginling College, where she collaborated with Minnie Vautrin to manage the refugee camps and evict Japanese soldiers who perpetrated violence against them. On June 16, 1938, she departed Nanjing for Chongqing. Following the war's conclusion, she returned to Nanjing and relocated to Taiwan in 1949, where she instructed children at the Huaxing Nursery School and died on September 9, 1983, in Taipei.
