= Lily Abegg =

Swiss journalist (1901–1974)

- Born: Elisabeth Hermine Abegg; December 7, 1901; Switzerland
- Died: July 13, 1974 (aged 72)
- Occupations: Journalist and author
- Writing career
- Period: 1930s - 1970s
- Genre: Nonfiction
- Subjects: East Asia and the Middle East

Elisabeth Hermine Abegg (7 December 1901 – 13 July 1974), known as Lily Abegg, was a Swiss journalist who reported on East Asian affairs for several European newspapers from the late 1930s through the mid-1960s and authored multiple books and journal articles from the 1940s through the early 1970s. Her work focused on the political climate of the Middle East and what was then described as the Far East region.

== Formative years ==
Abegg grew up in Yokohama, Japan, where her father Hans Abegg, traded in silk. Following her formative years, which were spent in Japan between 1902 and 1916, she studied political science in Geneva, Hamburg and Heidelberg, graduating with a doctorate.

== Career ==
Abegg undertook her first trip as a journalist in 1934, during which time she traveled to Japan, where she reported on the cultural and political climate there.

From 1934 to 1940, she was the East Asia correspondent of the Frankfurter Zeitung in Tokyo. In 1939, she reported from China about the Second Sino-Japanese War.

After returning to Switzerland, she wrote for the Weltwoche, reporting from the Middle East and South East Asia, but returned to her post as FAZ East Asia correspondent from 1954 to 1964. After she returned to Switzerland again in 1964, she served as Asia advisor to the FAZ.

=== 1945 arrest ===
Abegg, who had been placed on a list of suspected war criminals by United States Army General Douglas MacArthur, was arrested by American troops in September 1945 and imprisoned in Sugamo Prison, following the defeat of Japan and the end of World War II. Accused of making anti-American and anti-British propaganda broadcasts that were supportive of Germany and Japan, she was also accused of writing English language scripts for Tokyo Rose and was alleged to have published propaganda under the alias, Sybille Abe. Abegg denied those allegations during subsequent interviews with news reporters.

She was released from prison on January 24, 1946, due to "insufficient evidence," according to a new release that was issued by MacArthur's headquarters. She subsequently returned home to Switzerland.

=== Written works (abridged list) ===
Abegg researched and wrote multiple journal articles and books during her lifetime. An abridged list includes the following:

- Abegg, Lily. China's Erneuerung. Der Raum als Waffe. Frankfurt, Germany: Societäts-Verlag, 1940.
- Abegg, Lily. Yamato; la mission du peuple japonais. Paris, France: Arthème Fayard, 1942.
- Abegg, Lily. Neue Herren in Mittelost. Arabische Politik heute. Stuttgart, Germany: Deutsche Verlags-Anstalt Stuttgart, 1954.
- Abegg, Lily. "Japan Reconsiders," in Foreign Affairs, April 1, 1955.
- Abegg, Lily. Im Neuen China. Berlin, Germany: Atlantis Verlag, 1957.
- Abegg, Lily. De L'Empire du Milieu a Mao Tse-Toung. Lucerne, Switzerland: Rencontre, 1966.
- Abegg, Lily. Japan's Traum vom Musterland. Der neue Nipponismus. K. Desch, 1973.ISBN 9783420046759.

== Death ==
Abegg died on July 13, 1974.

== Legacy ==
With her several books about the society and politics of China and Japan, as well as her articles, Abegg helped to broaden popular knowledge about these countries in the German-speaking world.
