= St. Paul's Church, Nanjing =

Church building in Nanjing, China

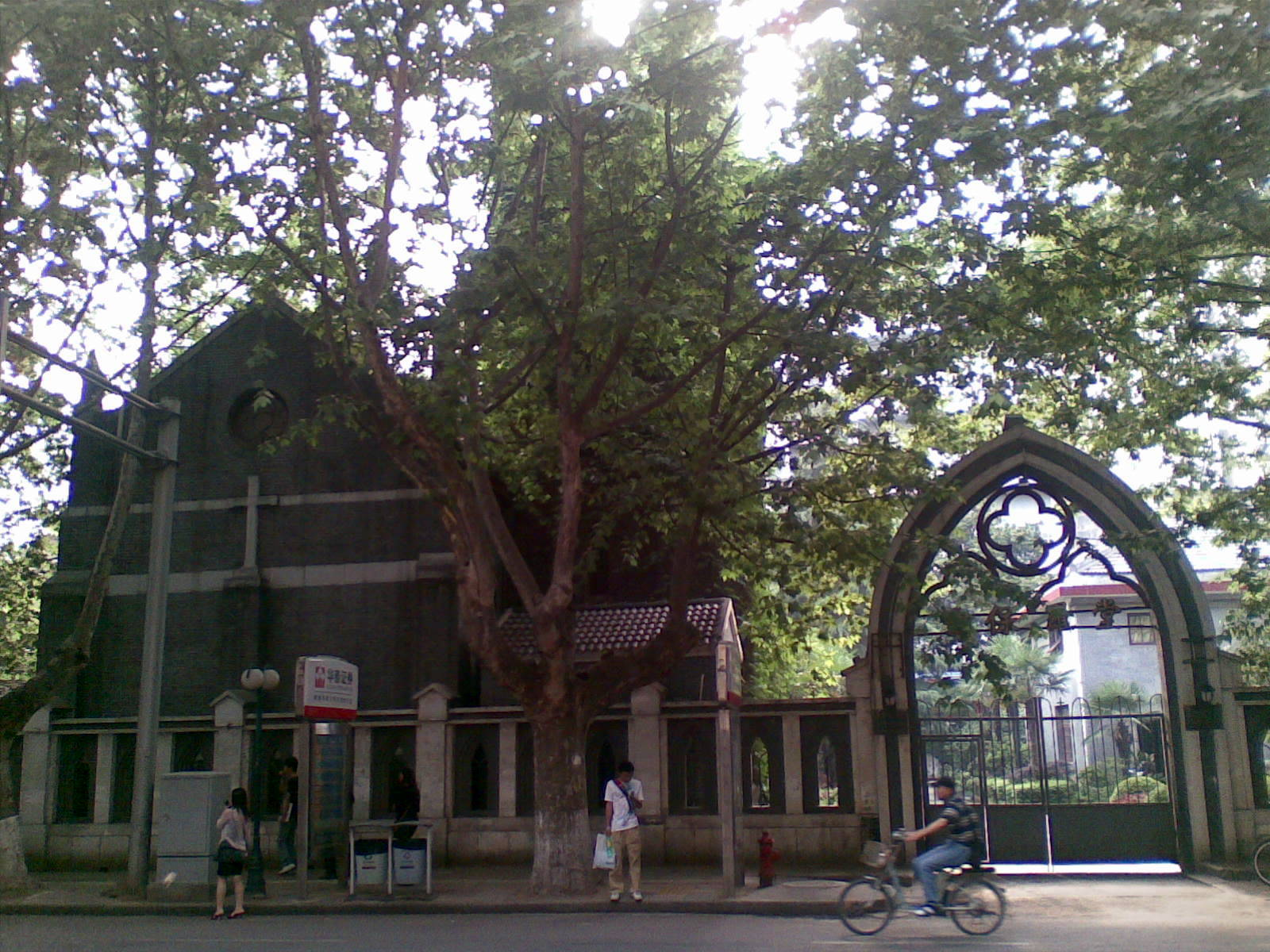
St. Paul's Church

St. Paul's Church (simplified Chinese: 圣保罗堂; traditional Chinese: 聖保羅堂) is a Three Self church in Nanjing. St. Paul's was established in 1912 on Taiping Road, in the south of the old city centre, which was at that time one of the most densely populated parts of the city. It was founded by the American Episcopalian missionary G.M.B. Gill. In 1922 a second, larger building was built next to the first building to be used as the new church building. During the Nanjing Massacre and the following Japanese occupation of Nanjing from 1937 to 1941 St. Paul's was one of the churches in Nanjing that provided shelter for refugees. When the People's Republic of China was founded in 1949, the building was one of the four churches in Nanjing that remained to be used as a church. In 1966 however, at the onset of the Cultural Revolution, the church stopped functioning. In 1984 the building was returned to the Three-Self Patriotic Movement, and from 1985 was re-opened again.

The church is built in the Gothic Revival style, with polished bricks. The building has been appointed as 'Municipality Protected Historic Site' by the city of Nanjing.
