= Miner Searle Bates =

American scholar (1897–1978)

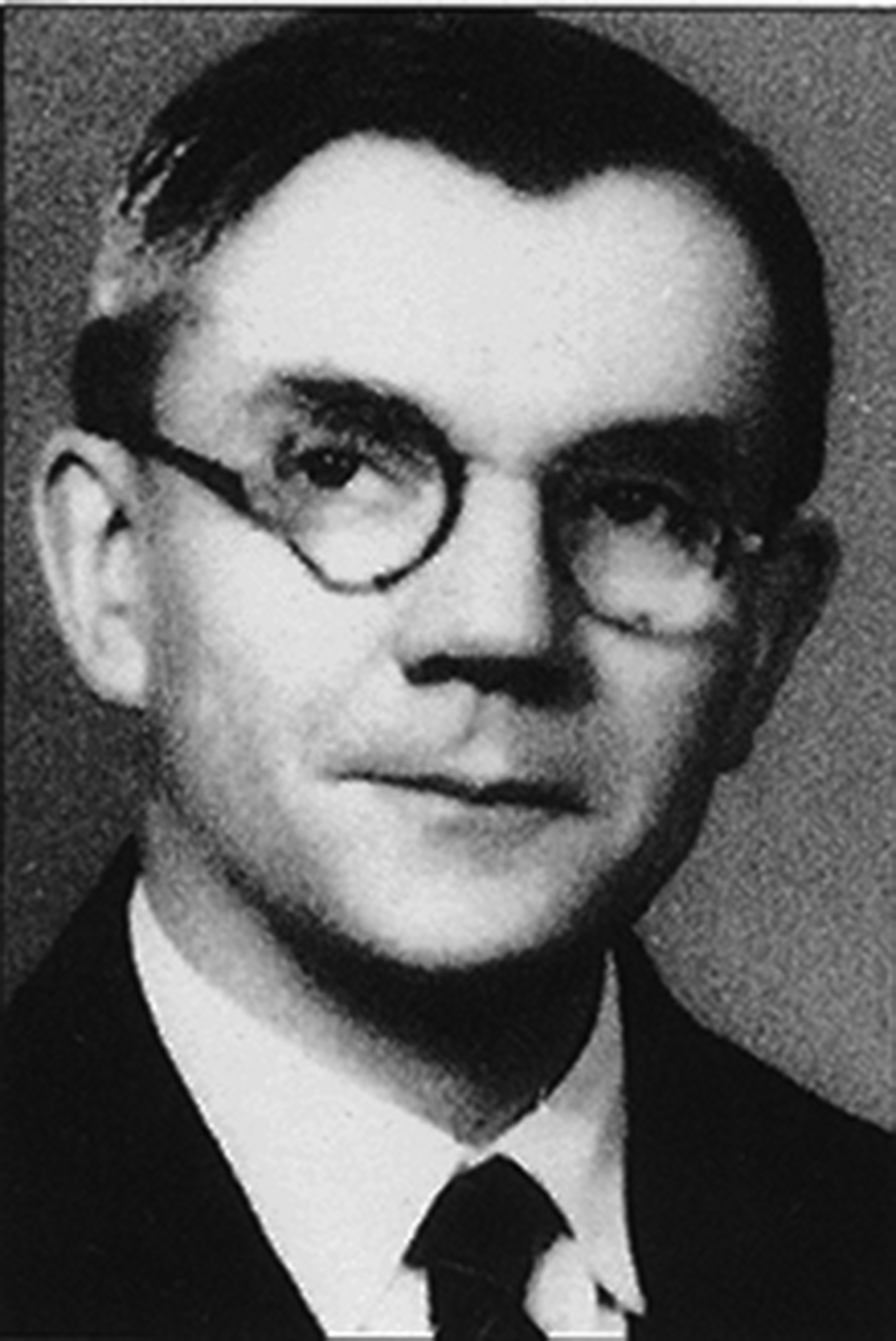
- Born: May 28, 1897; Newark, Ohio, U.S.
- Died: 1978 (aged 80–81); New York City, New York, U.S.

Academic background
- Education: University of Oxford; Yale University (PhD); Hiram University

Miner Searle Bates (Chinese name: Bei Deshi, 贝德士; 1897–1978) was an American scholar. He was an advisor to the Republic of China government.

== Life ==
Bates was educated at numerous prestigious institutions such as the University of Oxford, where he was a Rhodes Scholar; Yale University, where he earned a Ph.D. in Chinese history; and Hiram College, in Ohio. He worked with YMCA in India and Mesopotamia (then part of the Ottoman Empire) before finally beginning work at the University of Nanking sponsored by American churches, where he taught history from 1920 to 1950. In 1923 he married Lilliath Robbins, a teacher at nearby Ginling College.

In 1950, shortly after the Chinese Communist Party were victorious in the Chinese Civil War, the University of Nanking was merged with Nanjing University and Bates returned to the United States and was appointed Professor of Missions at Union Theological Seminary, where he taught until 1965. He wrote Religious Liberty: An Inquiry (1945), a study of religious freedoms and persecution across the globe.

== Nanking Massacre ==
In the summer of 1937, Bates travelled with his family to Japan, returning to Nanjing alone. He was thus present in Nanjing during the Battle of Nanking and in the subsequent period known as the Rape of Nanking. During this time, he became one of the leaders of the International Committee for the Nanking Safety Zone and worked to secure the safety of the remaining population of Nanking who were mostly those who were too poor to evacuate in advance of the Japanese assault on the city. This task was dangerous and his life was put at risk on many occasions, most notably when he was shoved down a flight of stairs by Japanese military police after inquiring about the fate of a student who had been abducted by Japanese soldiers. Bates pulled soldiers off women that they were molesting, and on several occasions, had pistols held to his head.

Bates was appointed Vice President of Nanjing University on January 13, 1938.

After the war, he was summoned as a witness at the Tokyo Trials and subsequent Chinese trials for war criminals. His testimony on the duration of the massacre became a common cited figure.

Bates is portrayed by Graham Sibley in the HBO film Nanking. He is quoted as having stated the following,

"Religious faith is believing that good things are worth doing for their own sake even in a world that seems overpoweringly evil. I remain assured in hard experience that neither by national guns nor by national gods will mankind be saved, but only by the genuine regard for all members of the human family."
