= Lewis S. C. Smythe =

American Christian missionary and sociologist

Lewis Strong Casey Smythe (pronounced "Smith"; January 31, 1901 – June 1, 1978) was a sociologist and an American Christian missionary to China who was present during the Nanjing Massacre.

Born in Washington, D.C., the son of Lewis Strong Smythe (of DeRuyter, New York) and Annie Amelia Casey (of New Brunswick, Canada), Smythe spent most of his early life in Great Falls, Montana where he finished high school and worked on a cattle ranch. During his undergraduate studies he met Margaret "Mardie" Lillian Garrett, an American born in Nanjing, China, to missionary parents; the couple married in 1924 and had two daughters – Margaret "Peggy" Ann (1931 – 2016) and E. Joan (1934 – 1963). Smythe enrolled at Drake College in 1918, where he received his Bachelor of Science in Law and BA degrees in 1923. In March 1927, he earned an MA (Department of Practical Theology, Chicago Divinity School) for his dissertation "The Social Background of the Shanghai Incident and Its Influence Upon Christian Missions in Chicago". In August 1928, he earned a Ph.D. (Department of Christian Theology and Ethics, Chicago Divinity School) for his dissertation "Bibliographic Details Changes in the Christian Message for China by Protestant Missionaries". He was also influenced by and affiliated with faculty from the University of Chicago's prestigious Chicago School (sociology), notably Ernest Burgess and Robert E. Park.

In 1928, the Smythes were dispatched to Nanjing (Nanking) by the United Christian Mission Society (Indianapolis, Indiana). Smythe served as Professor of Sociology at Nanking University (1928 – 1951) while his wife, a physician (MD from Rush University, Chicago, Illinois, served as a medical missionary.

Smythe was in Nanjing during the Battle of Nanking and its aftermath, the Nanjing Massacre. He served as Secretary of the International Committee for the Nanking Safety Zone from December 14, 1937 to February 10, 1938. In that role, he and the Committee's chairman, John Rabe, recorded the atrocities committed by Japanese troops and made daily reports complaining to the Japanese embassy. Smythe reported that while the Japanese embassy continually promised to do something about the atrocities, it was not until February 1938 that anything substantive was done to restore order to the city.

After the end of World War II, Smythe was among members of the International Committee for the Nanking Safety Zone who testified about the Nanjing Massacre to the International Military Tribunal of the Far East.

The Smythes were forced by the Communists to leave China in 1951. Smythe subsequently worked as an adviser to several organizations and wrote several articles and books relating to social change in China. He served as a Professor and Chair of the newly established Department of Christian Community (1952 – 1964) at The College of the Bible (Lexington, Kentucky During a one-year sabbatical (1957 – 1958), he served as the Assistant to the President of Silliman University (Dumaguete, Philippines) and instituted a local, rural development program.

In the documentary film Nanking, Smythe was portrayed by actor Stephen Dorff.

== See also ==
- War Damage in the Nanking area Dec.1937 to Mar.1938
- Minnie Vautrin
- John Rabe
