= Qi Zhaochang =

Chinese architect and artist (1880–1956)

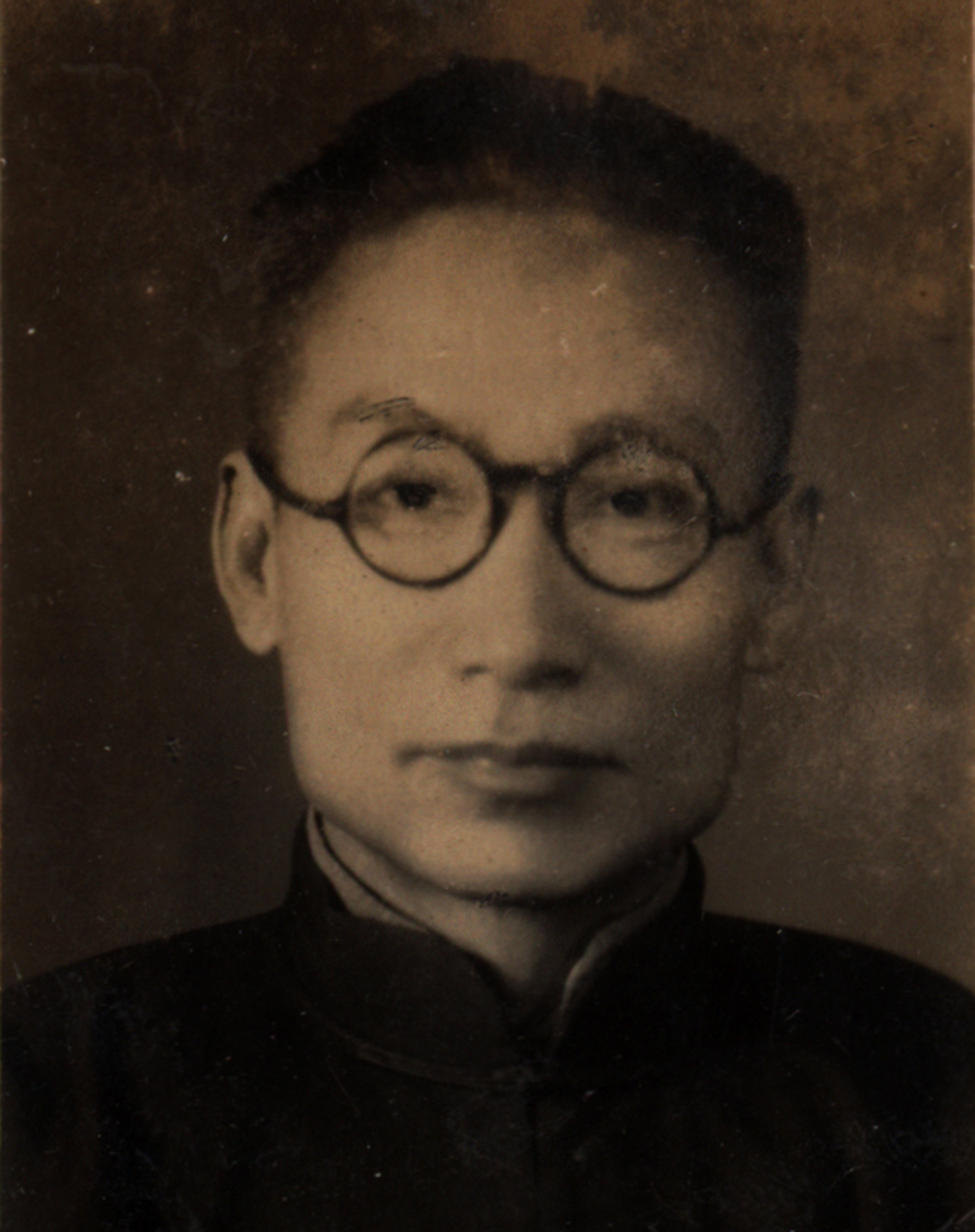
Qi Zhaochang

Qi Zhaochang (Chinese: 齐兆昌; 1880–1956) was a Chinese architect and civil engineer. He earned a master’s degree in civil engineering from the Ohio State University, worked on campus and church buildings in Nanjing, including projects at Jinling University and St. Paul’s Church, and taught agricultural engineering at Jinling University.

== Early life and career ==
Qi was born in Hangzhou, Zhejiang in 1880. He received financial assistance from the Christian Church and graduated from Zhejiang University while working as a daily bell-ringer. He later obtained a master's degree in civil engineering from Ohio State University in the United States.

== Career ==
After returning to China, Qi worked as an engineer at the Jiangxi Guling Engineering Bureau. After completing the design of St. Paul's Church, Nanjing, he left his position at the Presbyterian Architectural Office in northern Shanghai and joined the Engineering Office of Jinling University, where he was also a professor of agricultural engineering.

During the 1920s, Qi oversaw the engineering and construction of the North Building, as well as the design and construction of the West Building at Jinling University. He was involved in construction of the Science and Technology Museum, the university gymnasium, several student dormitories (Buildings A-D), and faculty housing. His other architectural projects included Twinem Memorial Chapel, Ginling College, and Nanjing Zhonghua High School.

Following the September 18th Incident and Japan's annexation of Northeast China, anti-Japanese sentiment grew in the region. In September 1934, a steel-framed flagpole was erected at the Japanese Embassy in China, adjacent to Jinling University, and reaching the height of the university's North Building. The daily visibility of the Japanese flag was a source of discontent among the university's faculty and students. In early October, a group of 30 students proposed constructing a taller flagpole to express national pride. With the university's support, a new steel flagpole, designed by Qi Zhaochang, was constructed. Completed in August 1935, the flagpole measured over forty meters in height, with the Chinese national flag extending more than three meters above the North Building and rising higher than the adjacent Japanese flag. The initiative was widely supported by the Jinling University community.

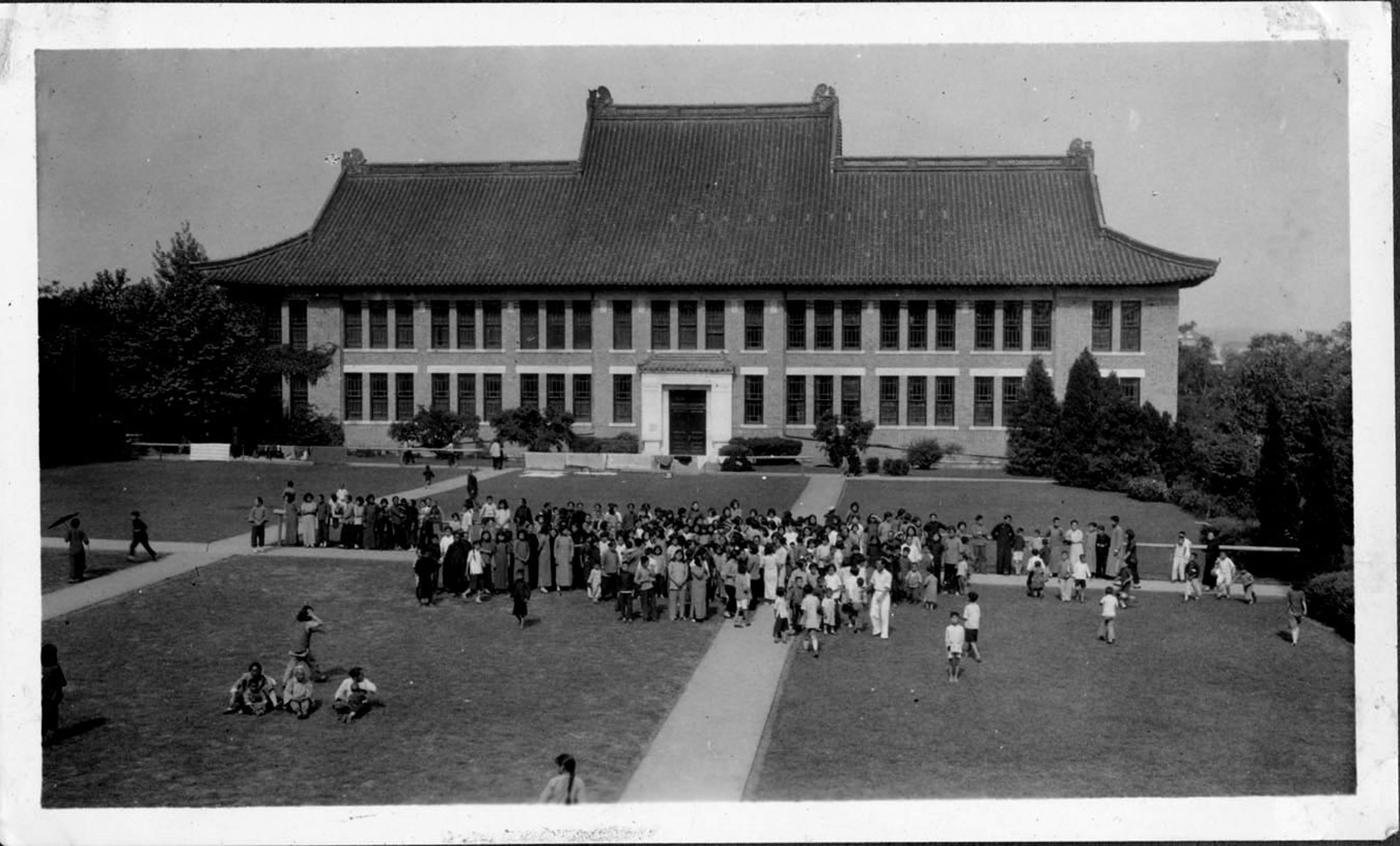
Refugee Shelter at Jinling University in 1937

Following the onset of the Battle of Shanghai, Jinling University was compelled to relocate westward. To safeguard the university's assets, Qi remained in Nanjing alongside approximately 30 other Chinese and Western faculty members. In December 1937, he became a member of the Emergency Committee of Jinling University, concurrently serving as the head of the third district of the Nanjing Safety Zone and as a member of the Housing Committee.

During the Nanjing Massacre, a refugee shelter was established on the university campus, and Qi was appointed its director. The shelter, located in one of the dormitories, accommodated over 30,000 refugees. Despite its designation as part of the Safety Zone, the shelter was repeatedly entered by armed Japanese soldiers, who reportedly detained Chinese soldiers and policemen. They also abducted women, with multiple reports of sexual violence. Residential buildings and stores on campus were looted and, in some cases, set on fire.

As director of the Refugee Shelter, Qi faced personal danger. On one occasion, when Japanese troops reportedly intended to execute him, Charles Riggs, a professor in the Department of Agronomy at Jinling University, intervened and prevented the killing.

In 1942, after the Japanese army occupied the Jinling University campus, Qi Zhaochang and other staff relocated to Ganheyan adjacent to Huiwen College, which was renamed "Tonglun Middle School" (now Jinling High School). Qi served as the general administrator, helping to maintain educational activities for out-of-school youth and supporting the faculty in sustaining operations.

Following Japan's surrender in 1945, Qi continued his work at the university. In 1952, during the national reorganization of higher education institutions, Jinling University was merged with other colleges to form the new Nanjing University, where Qi was appointed director of the Public Works Department. He died of cancer at Gulou Hospital in 1956.

== Family ==
His youngest son, Qi Kang, is an architect who designed the Memorial Hall of the Victims in Nanjing Massacre by Japanese Invaders.
