= Gezhi School =

Gezhi School may refer to:

- Fuzhou Gezhi High School
- Shanghai Gezhi High School
