= NSZ =

NSZ can refer to:

- Nanking Safety Zone, a demilitarized area in Nanking, China in 1937-1938
- Narodowe Siły Zbrojne (National Armed Forces), World War II resistance movement in Poland
