= Li Minhua =

Chinese aerospace engineer and physicist

- 李敏华
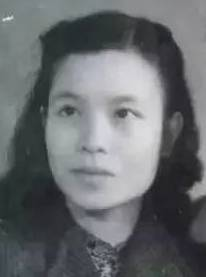
- Li Minhua, c. 1943
- Born: 2 November 1917; Wu County, Jiangsu, China
- Died: 19 January 2013 (aged 95); Beijing, China
- Other name: Minghua Lee Wu
- Education: Tsinghua University, National Southwestern Associated University, Massachusetts Institute of Technology
- Spouse: Wu Zhonghua (m. 1943; died 1992)
- Scientific career
- Fields: Solid mechanics
- Workplaces: Lewis Flight Propulsion Laboratory, Polytechnic Institute of Brooklyn, Institute of Mechanics, Chinese Academy of Sciences
- Theses: Three-dimensional photoelasticity problems (1945); Subharmonic resonance of system having non-linear spring with variable coefficient (1948)
- Doctoral advisor: J.P. Den Hartog
- Other academic advisors: W.M. Murray

Chinese name
- Traditional Chinese: 李敏華
- Simplified Chinese: 李敏华
Transcriptions
Standard Mandarin
- Hanyu Pinyin: Lǐ Mǐnhuá
- Wade–Giles: Li Min-hua

Li Minhua (Chinese: 李敏华; 2 November 1917 – 19 January 2013), also known as Minghua Lee Wu, was a Chinese aerospace engineer and physicist who was an expert in solid mechanics. The first woman to earn a PhD in mechanical engineering from the Massachusetts Institute of Technology, she was one of the founding scientists at the Institute of Mechanics of the Chinese Academy of Sciences (CAS), and was elected as an academician in 1980. Her husband Wu Zhonghua was also an accomplished physicist and CAS academician.

== Early life and education ==
Li was born on 2 November 1917 in Wu County (now Suzhou), Jiangsu, China. She graduated from Wu Pen Girls' School in Shanghai and was admitted to Tsinghua University in 1935. After the Second Sino-Japanese War broke out in 1937, Tsinghua and several other universities evacuated Beijing and moved south to Kunming, Yunnan Province, where they combined their diminished resources to form the temporary National Southwestern Associated University (Lianda). Deeply affected by Japanese aggression, Li chose to study aeronautical engineering in order to contribute to China's national defense. She was among the first class of students to graduate from Lianda's Department of Aeronautical Engineering in 1940, and was hired as a faculty member by the university. In 1943, she married Wu Zhonghua, a fellow physicist and Tsinghua/Lianda alumnus and faculty member.

== Career in the United States ==
In 1944, Li and Wu went to the United States to study at the Massachusetts Institute of Technology. Li studied mechanical engineering, while Wu specialized in the internal combustion engine. She gave birth to two sons while at MIT, and the couple took turns looking after the children. She earned her master's degree in 1945 and her ScD (PhD-equivalent) in 1948, overcoming then-prevalent sexual discrimination and becoming the first female MIT student to earn a PhD in mechanical engineering.

After graduation from MIT, Li and Wu both joined the Lewis Flight Propulsion Laboratory of the National Advisory Committee for Aeronautics (NACA, the predecessor of NASA) as research scientists. She published several NACA reports, and was elected to the Sigma Xi honor society.

With the outbreak of the Korean War, relations between the US and the newly established People's Republic of China turned openly hostile, and Li and Wu decided they could no longer work for the US military. They resigned from NACA and became professors at the Polytechnic Institute of Brooklyn in 1951. In 1954, they resolved to return to China. To avoid suspicion of the US government, the family flew to Britain in August ostensibly for a vacation. From there they traveled through Switzerland and Austria to Czechoslovakia, finally arriving in Beijing at the end of the year via the Soviet Union.

== Career in China ==
Back in China, Li and Wu were received personally by Premier Zhou Enlai. She joined the Institute of Mechanics of the Chinese Academy of Sciences (CAS), which was being established by Qian Xuesen and Qian Weichang, and served as head of the plasticity group, one of the four research groups under the institute. In 1958, Li was appointed head of solid mechanics at the newly established University of Science and Technology of China. In 1959, she became a senior scientist at the First Design Institute of the CAS and participated in the design of China's satellite launch system. She was elected an academician of the CAS in 1980.

Li made major contributions to aerospace research in China. Her paper "General plastic behaviour and method of solution for plane stress problems with axial symmetry in strain hardening range considering finite strain" won the State Natural Science Award (third class) in 1956. In 1959, she led a team that designed China's first instantaneous heat load testing system for the satellite carrier rocket. In the 1970s, she developed a method to analyze defects in aerospace turbomachinery, and won the 1978 Major Achievement Award from the CAS. Her research on engine defects led to her later focus on material fatigue, which she extensively researched until she was in her eighties. Starting in 1982, she organized a biennial national conference on material fatigue.

Li died on 19 January 2013, at the age of 95.
