= Han Xianglin =

Chinese humanitarian

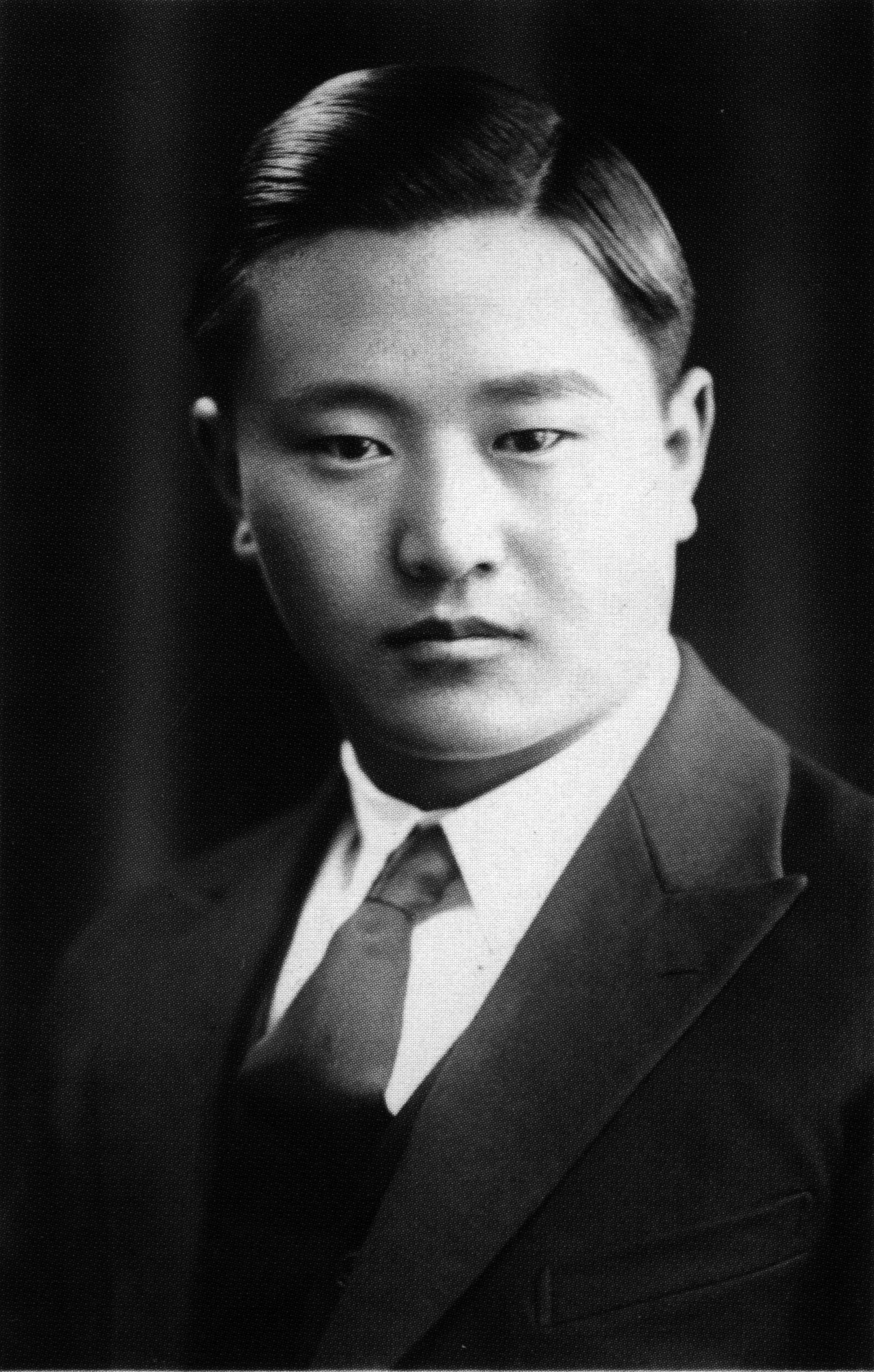
Han Xianglin

Han Xianglin (1906 – March 1, 1985, Chinese: 韩湘琳) was a Chinese humanitarian and a prominent role during the Nanjing Massacre (1937–1938). He was born in Linzi County, Shandong Province, and graduated from Shandong Christian University.

He served as a multilingual secretary and interpreter for John Rabe, a German businessman and chairman of the International Committee for the Nanking Safety Zone. Proficient in English, German, and French, Han was instrumental in orchestrating relief efforts.

== Biography ==
Despite Rabe's insistence on evacuating Nanjing prior to the Japanese attack, Han declined, asserting, "Where you stay, I stay, too" in September 1937, as documented in Rabe's notebook. As the appointed director of the Siemens Refugee Camp and head of the Safety Zone's Food Committee, Han managed the distribution of 10,000 dan (9,076 bags) of rice and 1,000 bags of flour to more than 600 refugees accommodated at Rabe's apartment on Xiaofenqiao Road. He coordinated patrols to prevent Japanese soldiers from infiltrating the camp and personally intervened to halt crimes, enduring a brutal assault from a soldier during a confrontation.

Han orchestrated essential contributions, comprising two vehicles, 100 cans of gasoline, and 200 bags of grain from an industrialist in Shandong, thereby guaranteeing the early operational capability of the Nanking Safety Zone. After the Nanjing Massacre, he provided testimony against Japanese war crimes and then served in the printing department of Nanjing University until his retirement.
