= Ma Chaochun =

Chinese politician (1886–1977)

- 馬超俊
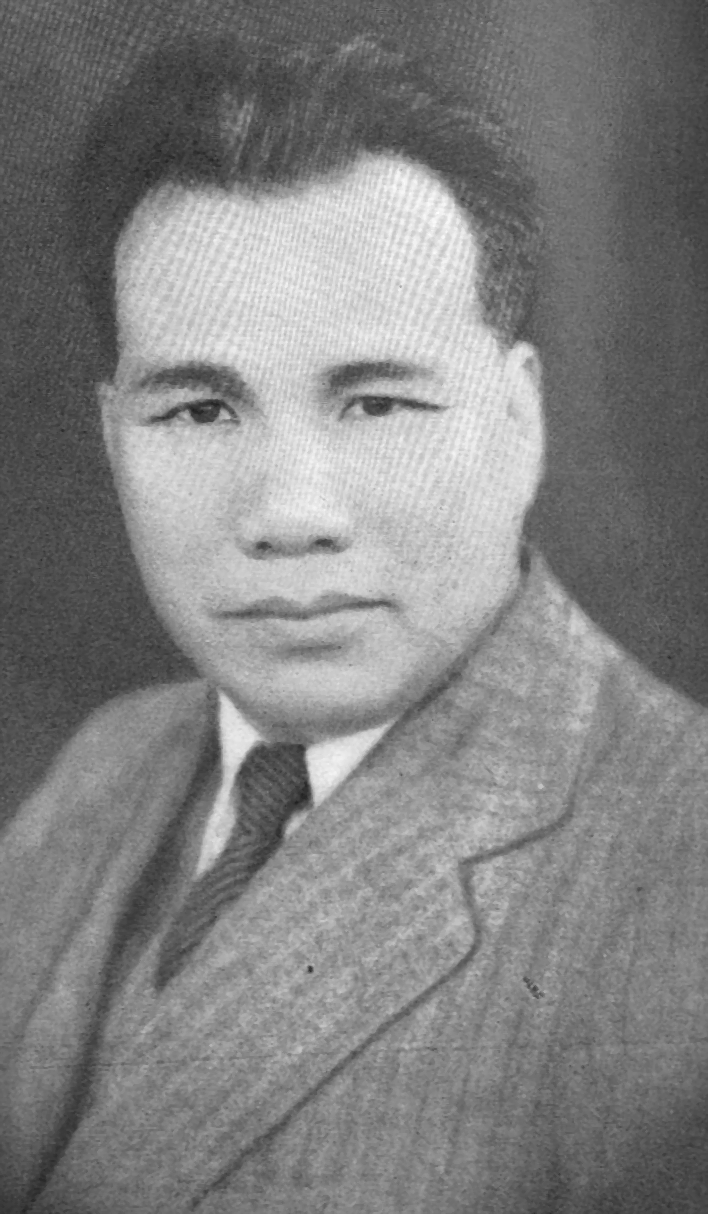
- Ma Chao-chun as Mayor c. 1935

Mayor of Nanjing

Personal details
- Born: 1886 Taishan, Guangdong, Qing dynasty
- Died: 1977 (aged 90–91) Taipei, Taiwan
Ma Chaochun
- Traditional Chinese: 馬超俊
- Simplified Chinese: 马超俊
Transcriptions
Standard Mandarin
- Hanyu Pinyin: Mǎ Chāojùn
- Bopomofo: ㄇㄚˇ ㄔㄠㄐㄩㄣˋ
- Wade–Giles: Ma^{3} Ch'ao^{1}-chün
Yue: Cantonese
- Jyutping: Maa^{5} Ciu^{1}-zeon^{1}
other Yue
- Taishanese: Ma^{4} Ciau^{1}-dun^{1}
Southern Min
- Hokkien POJ: Má Chhiau-chùn

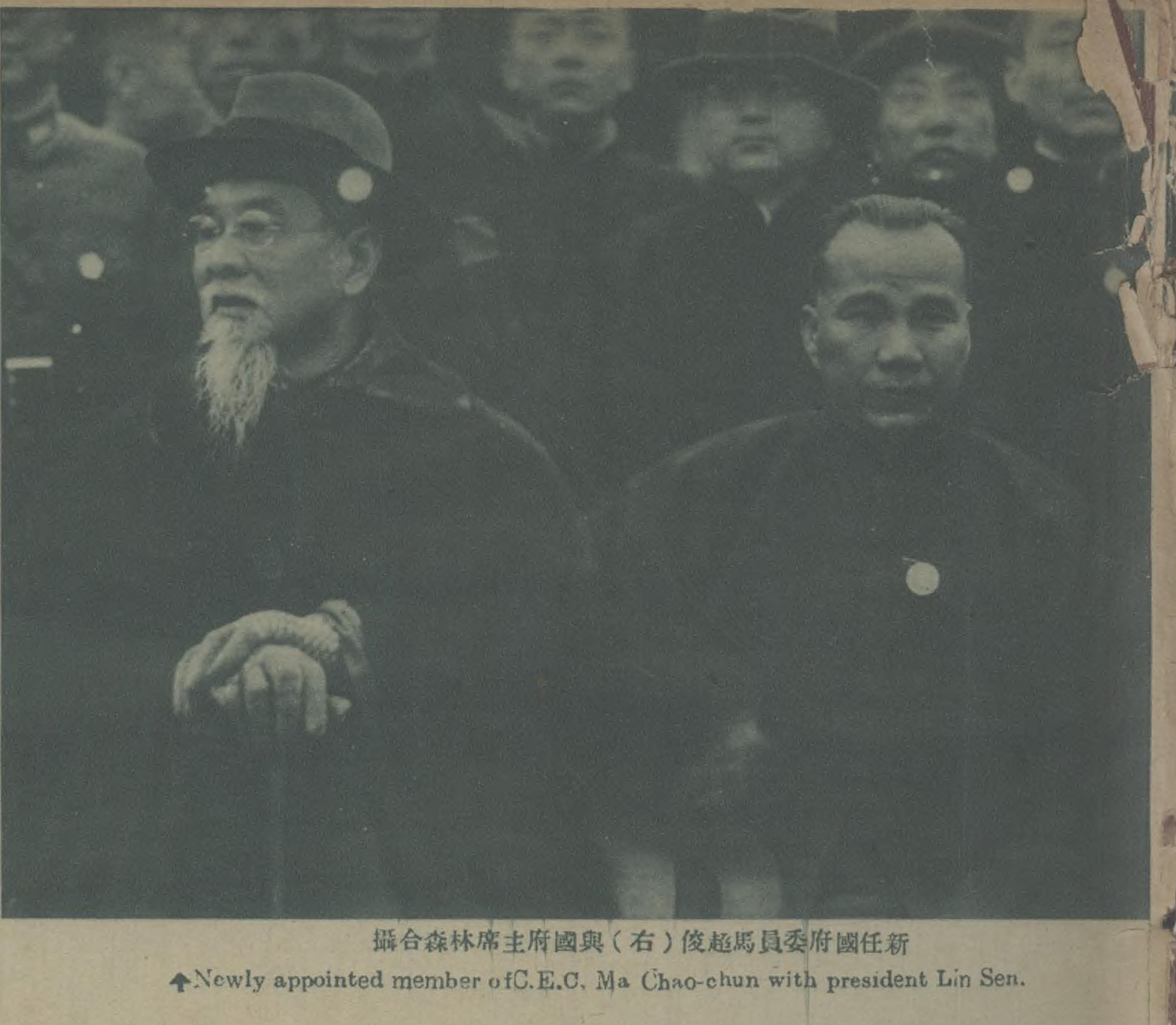
Ma Chao-chun in 1935 with Chinese President Lin Sen

Ma Chao-chun (traditional Chinese: 馬超俊; simplified Chinese: 马超俊; Pinyin: Mǎ Chāojùn; 1886–1977) was the mayor of Nanjing in the period prior to the Battle of Nanking. On December 1, 1937, Ma Chao-chun ordered all Chinese citizens remaining in Nanjing to move into the Nanking Safety Zone. Ma fled the city on December 7, and the International Committee took over as the de facto government of Nanjing.

He died in Taipei at age 91.
