= Qi Kang (architect) =

Chinese architect

- Born: October 28, 1931 (age 95); Nanjing, China
- Occupation: Architect
- Buildings: Nanjing Massacre Memorial Hall

Qi Kang (Chinese: 齐康) is a Chinese architect and artist. He is a supervisor in Southeast University, Academician of Chinese Academy of Sciences, Foreign Academician of French Academy of Architecture (Académie d'architecture de France), and Director of Research Institute of Architecture of Southeast University.

== Early life ==
Qi's family is originally from Tiantai County, Zhejiang Province, China. Qi's family is descendant Qi Zhaonan(齊召南), a notable Chinese geologist and writer. In 1931, Qi was born in Nanjing, China. Qi's mother is Chen Youhe (陈友鹤) and his father is Qi Zhaochang (齐兆昌). Qi's father was the chief engineer of the Nanjing University (formally Jingling University) from 1920 to 1950. His mother taught Mathematics at Heiwen High School for Girls (which later became Jinling College).

In 1949, Qi graduated from Jinling High School.

== Education ==
In 1952, Qi graduated with a degree in architecture from Southeast University (formally Nanjing Institute of Technology). Qi studied under professors Yang Tingbao, Liu Dunzhen (刘敦桢) and Tong Jun (童寯).

== Career ==
Qi started his career teaching at Southeast University.

In 1954, Qi became an intern planner at Beijing Capital City Planning Committee, where he worked until 1957.

After returning to Southeast University, Qi was appointed as the educational research group director, head of the Department of Architecture and vice-president of University. Qi established The Research Institute of Architecture in South East University in 1980- the first institution allowing architects to teach graduate students and practice architectural design in China.

== Projects ==
Qi works to integrate contemporary and Western technology in redefining Chinese Architecture. His work, which stems from Classical principles, is imbued with contemporary innovations. Over the past 50 years, many Chinese architects tend to either adhere to classical forms, or embrace the western approach. Qi Kang has combined the two. In the past 40 years, he has designed over 200 projects, many of which are meaningful to China. Among those that have won acclaim beyond China are:

- Fujian Wuyi Mountain Villa (武夷山庄), 1984
- Nanjing Massacre Memorial Hall, 1983–1985 (Phase 1), 1995 (Phase 2)
- Yuhuatai Memorial Park of Revolutionary Martyrs, 1988
- Henan Museum, 1999
- Harbin Jingshang History Museum, 1998
- Nanjing Gulou Post Mansion, c. 1998
- September 18 Historical Museum (九·一八历史博物馆), 1999
- Nanjing Museum of Paleontology (南京古生物博物馆), 2004
- China Shoes Museum, 2005

== Teaching and Research ==
Qi Kang is a teacher and researcher. He has participated in or chaired many national, provincial and regional planning associations and committees critical in the reconstruction of China. His research paper "Urbanization Process of Relatively Developed Regions and Small Cities Procedural Economy Policies" (较发达地区城市化途径和小城镇技术经济政策) received 2nd place of "Progressive Science and Technique Award" (科技进步二等奖) by the Ministry of Construction. His Recheach "The Synthesis Planning Method for Villages and Towns" (乡镇综合规划设计方法), "The City Planning and Architectural Environmental Design Theory and the Method" (城镇建筑环境规划设计理论与方法) and "The Citys and Towns Environmental Design" (城镇环境设计) wins the Ministry of Education Technological Award first prize, the second prize, the third prize separately. Qi Kang is an avid sketcher who draws whenever not otherwise engaged. He has completed volumes of drawings—of architecture and landscape—which widely used by architectural students and others.

== Publications ==
Selected books by Qi Kang:

- Urban Planning
  - 城市建筑, publisher: 东南大学出版社, ISBN 978-7-81050-747-9
  - 城市环境规划设计与方法, Publisher:中国建筑工业出版社, ISBN 7-112-03119-2
  - 走向新社区:城市居住社区整体营造理论与方法, publisher:东南大学出版社, ISBN 7-81089-165-0
  - Cités d’Asie, Les Cahiers de la recherche architecturale, no 35-36, “Urban Development and the Conservation of Heritage in China”, by ISBN 2-86364-835-7, ISBN 978-2-86364-835-3
- Architecture
  - 日月同辉：南京雨花台烈士陵园纪念馆、碑轴线群体的创作设计(in Chinese, English and Japanese), Publisher: 辽宁科学技术出版社, ISBN 7-5381-2685-6
  - 建筑创作的纪程—齐康作品集, Publisher:中国建筑工业出版社, ISBN 7-112-03341-1
  - 齐康建筑设计作品系列：4, Publisher: 辽宁科学技术出版社, ISBN 7-5381-2889-1
  - 齐康建筑设计作品系列：3, Publisher: 辽宁科学技术出版社, ISBN 7-5381-2888-3
  - 齐康建筑设计作品系列：7, Publisher: 辽宁科学技术出版社, ISBN 7-5381-3517-0
  - 建筑创意(齐康及其合作者作品选), Publisher: 东南大学出版社, ISBN 978-7-5641-1576-0, ISBN 7-5641-1576-9
  - "九•一八"历史博物馆(in Chinese, English and Japanese), Publisher: 辽宁科学技术出版社, ISBN 7-5381-3271-6
  - 建筑思迹, publisher: 黑龙江科学技术出版社, ISBN 7-5388-3425-7
  - 纪念的凝思 (Condensation in Memorial Thought), publisher:中国建筑工业出版社, ISBN 7-112-02788-8
  - 侵华日军南京大屠杀遇难同胞纪念馆(in Chinese, English and Japanese), publisher:辽宁科学技术出版社, ISBN 7-5381-2713-5
- Drawings and Paintings
  - 风景入画-建筑师钢笔风景画, publisher: 东南大学出版社, ISBN 978-7-5641-0702-4, 2007
  - 画的记忆-建筑师徒手画, publisher: 东南大学出版社, ISBN 978-7-5641-0703-1, 2007
  - 水的彩虹:齐康水彩画选(建筑学基础训练参考丛书), publisher: 东南大学出版社, ISBN 7-5641-1751-6 / ISBN 978-7-5641-1751-1, 2009

== Exhibitions ==
His architectural design works has been exhibited in China, France, Switzerland, and Canada.
