= Charles Henry Riggs =

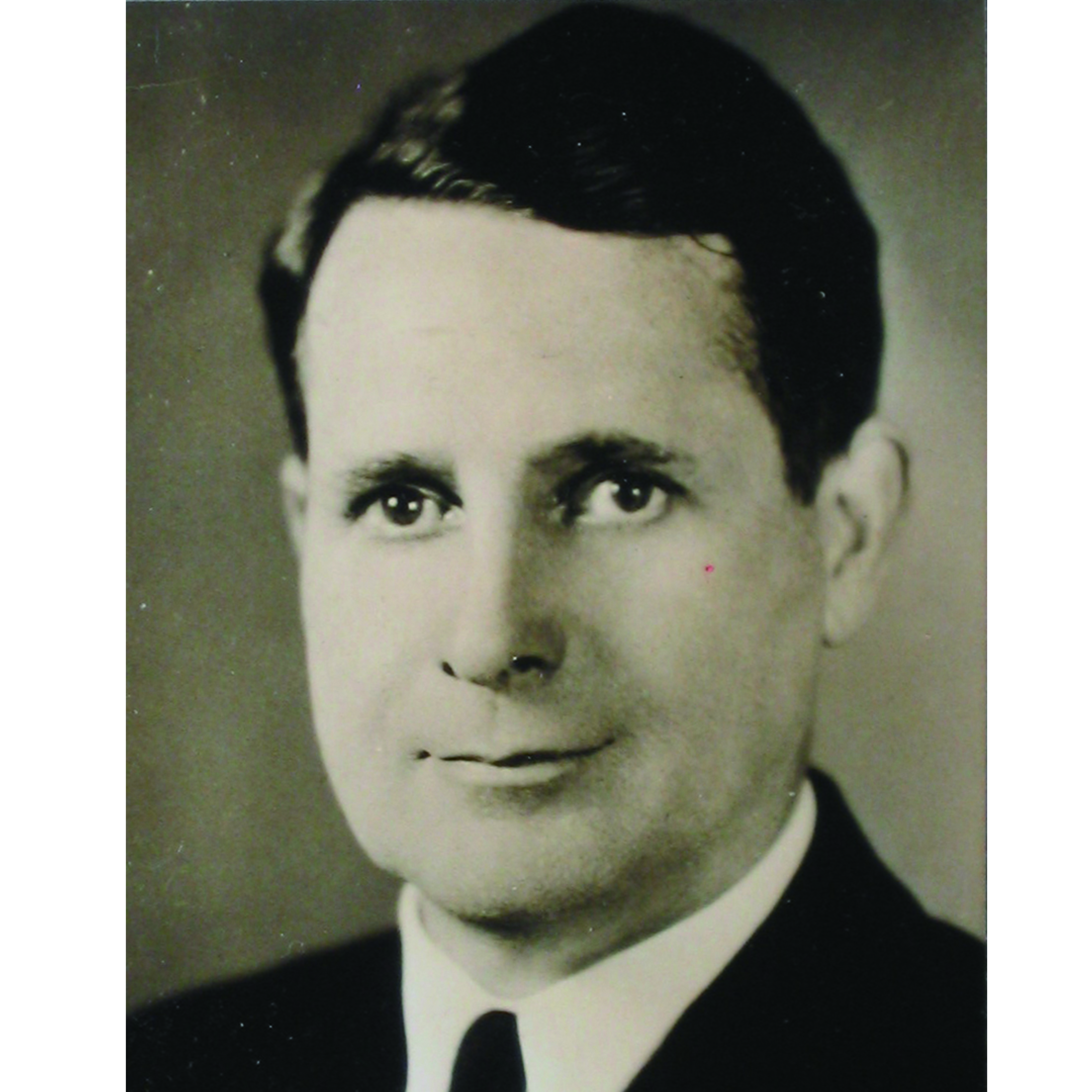
Charles Henry Riggs

Charles Henry Riggs (Chinese: 查尔斯·里格斯, 林查理, February 6, 1892—March 13, 1953) was born in Aintab, Turkey. He was an American Presbyterian missionary and agricultural engineer. He is the grandson of Elias Riggs.

== Biography ==
At the age of two, Riggs's family relocated to Ohio. He was raised in Oberlin and completed his education at Oberlin High School in 1909. He obtained his Bachelor of Science in Agriculture from Ohio State University in 1914. One year later, he encountered his future wife, Grace Edna Frederick. They wed on August 31, 1916, and thereafter journeyed to China together. The pair resided in Nanjing for one year, where they enrolled in a language school. Then they proceeded to Shaowu, Fujian province, where Riggs oversaw the newly established Agricultural Experiment Station.

Subsequently, Riggs returned to the United States to advance his studies. He obtained his Bachelor of Divinity from the Union Theological Seminary in New York City in 1931 and his Master of Science in Agricultural Engineering from Cornell University in 1932. Upon his return to China, he was designated Professor of Agricultural Engineering at University of Nanking in 1932.

In the autumn of 1937, as the Japanese military advanced into Nanjing, Grace Edna Riggs returned to the United States with her children, while Charles Henry Riggs remained and commenced his work for the Nanking Safety Zone. During Nanjing Massacre, Riggs served as the Housing Commissioner for the International Committee for the Nanking Safety Zone, tasked with the responsibility of opening and arranging residences for the refugees. In a letter to his wife, he stated that he relocated over 100,000 individuals within a single week. In the initial phase of the occupation, Riggs frequently patrolled the university grounds and expelled any intruders. Subsequently, he assumed responsibility for the fuel transportation to the facilities in the refugee camps and became a technical advisor overseeing the transportation system.

In 1939, he made a brief trip to the United States to reunite with his family. After about three months in the United States, he and Grace returned to West China, where the Chengdu campus of University of Nanking had been transferred. Riggs was solicited to assist in the production of textiles, including military blankets. Subsequently, he served as an advisor to the National Agricultural Engineering Cooperation in Chongqing and Guiyang, Guizhou province.

In 1945, he was summoned to Washington D.C. to offer his expertise to the United Nations Relief and Rehabilitation Administration China Aid Initiative. After only six months later, he traveled back to Nanjing, where he resumed his professorship in 1946. Riggs left China in 1951 due to Korean War and returned to the United States. In July 1951, he underwent laryngeal surgery but did not recover and died on March 13, 1953.
