= Nanjing Zhonghua High School =

- 中华中学
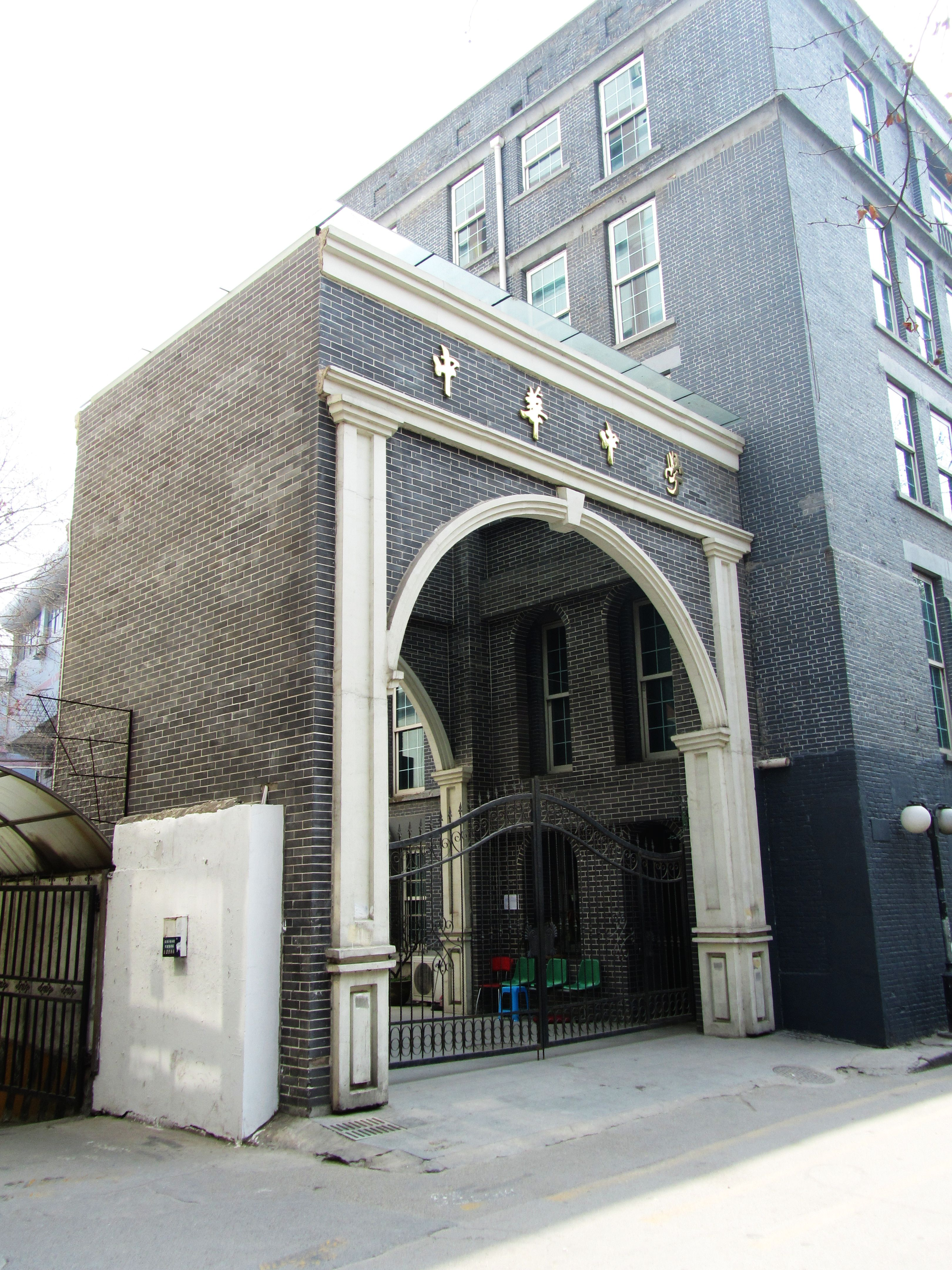

Location
- 369 Zhonghua Road,210006; Nanjing, Jiangsu; China

Information
- Type: Public, secondary
- Motto: 敬德修业方自励,博物明理能用世
- Established: 1899
- Principal: Zheng Zhu (朱征)
- Staff: 213 (as of December 2012)
- Enrollment: 2,549 (as of December 2012)
- Campus: Urban
- Website: Official Website

Nanjing Zhonghua High School (Chinese: 中华中学; pinyin: Zhonghua Zhōngxué), was founded by Dr. William E. Macklin (马林), a British missionary doctor, in 1899.

== History ==
The school's name was Christian Middle School when it was founded by Dr. William E. Macklin, who founded Gulou Hospital in Nanjing as well. Nanjing Zhonghua High School had been a school for women and changed its name several times. In 1929, the school was Yuqun (育群) High School, then it was renamed Nanjing No.1 Girls High School in 1951. In 1968, under the influence of the Chinese Culture Revolution movement, the school was renamed Nanjing Dongfanghong (东方红) High School. It was officially named Nanjing Zhonghua High School in 1983. Throughout the history, Nanjing Zhonghua High School has been an outstanding high school in the city of Nanjing, the capital of Jiangsu province, and once the capital of the Republic of China.

== Hexi Campus ==
The campus on 369 Zhonghua Road, Nanjing, is now the campus for Nanjing Zhonghua Middle School. The high school section moved to 208 Xinglong Avenue in Hexi. The Hexi campus is much larger than the old one and provides better facilities with 11 buildings including 60 classrooms and dorms that can host about 2,000 students. It is also close to the Olympic Stadium station of Subway line 1 and Lüboyuan station of Subway Line 10. Hexi campus opened in fall 2011, though it lacked the tradition and culture of Zhonghua High School in the points of view of some students and parents.

== Yuhua Campus ==
In 2022, following a unified plan by the Nanjing municipal government and the construction led by Yuhuatai District, the Yuhua Campus of Nanjing Zhonghua High School’ officially opened at 28 Yude Road, Yuhuatai District. Since then, the school has operated across two campuses under an integrated management model. The school’s international division also began enrolling students in 2022, with all classes held at the Yuhua Campus.

The Yuhua Campus covers 200 mu (approximately 13.3 hectares) and features three teaching buildings accommodating up to 60 classes. A two-story cafeteria can seat 2,000 people at once, and student dormitories house four students per room with en-suite bathrooms and separate wet and dry areas. The campus also features an integrated STREAM center, encompassing Science, Technology, Reading, Engineering, Arts, and Mathematics, as well as a professionally designed two-story auditorium that accommodates over 1,500 people and is equipped for high-level performances. Its sports facilities, including the athletic field, gymnasium, and training halls, all meet international competition standards. Landscaped areas include the Laolao Pavilion Park (劳劳亭公园) and a lake inhabited by black swans.

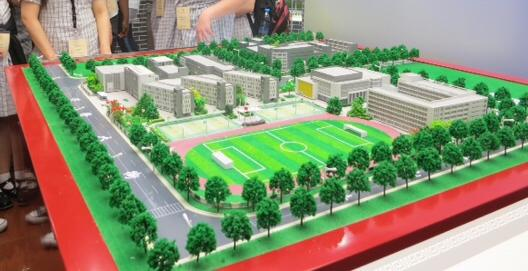
Display of Nanjing Zhonghua High School Campus in Hexi
