= Nanjing Jinling High School =

Coordinates: 32°2′52.8″N 118°46′58.1″E

- 金陵中学

Location
- 169 Zhongshan Road, 210005; Nanjing, Jiangsu; China

Information
- School type: Public, secondary 四星级普通高中
- Motto: "Honesty, Truth, Diligence, Benevolence" (诚、真、勤、仁)
- Established: 1888
- Principal: Xili Sun (孙夕礼)
- Staff: 236 (as of August 2006)
- Years offered: 3
- Enrollment: 2,800 (as of 2024)
- Campus: Urban
- Website: Official site

Nanjing Jinling High School (Chinese: 南京市金陵中学; pinyin: Jīnlíng Zhōngxué, or Jin-Zhong/金中 for short) is a public high school located in Gulou District, Nanjing, Jiangsu, China.

== History ==
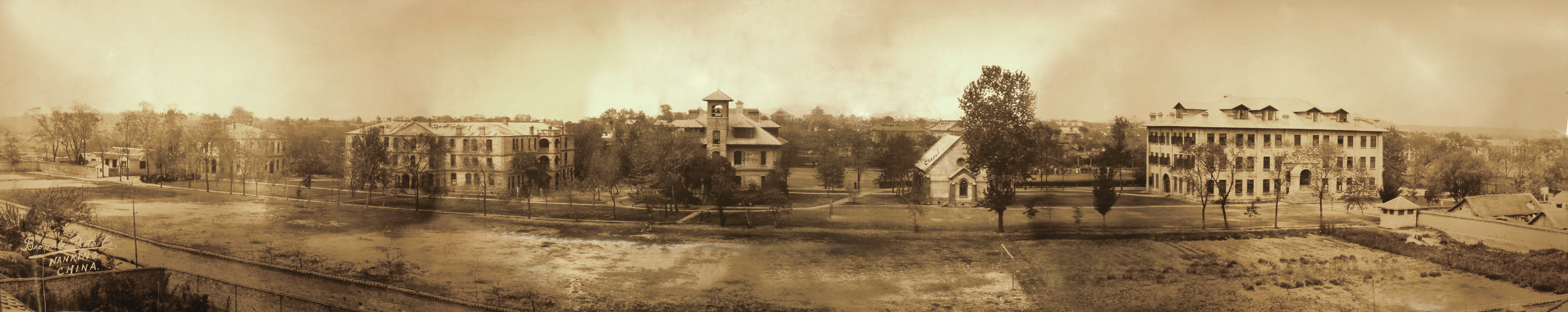
Panorama of University of Nanking Middle School from 1925 to 1926. The buildings from left to right are: west teaching building, dormitory, bell tower, chapel, and east teaching building.

American missionaries of Methodist Episcopal Church in China founded Fowler Biblical School (Chinese: 汇文书院; pinyin: Huìwén Shūyuàn) in 1888 and established its high school branch in 1890. Fowler Biblical School was reorganized as Jinling University (University of Nanking) since 1910 and the high school branch had been therefore called University of Nanking Middle School (金陵大学附属中学) and Jinling High School for short.

In 1937, the school was relocated to Chongqing due to the Second Sino-Japanese War. During the Nanking Massacre, the school's campus was part of the Nanking Safety Zone, where civilians were protected from the slaughter by Japanese troops. The school restored its operation in Nanjing in 1939, which was fully recovered in 1946 after the war.

The school's name was changed to Nanjing No. 10 Middle School (南京市第十中学) in 1951 following the merger with the High School Affiliated to Ginling College (金陵女子文理学院附属中学). The school's original name "Jinling High School" was restored in 1988 before the centennial anniversary.

Jinling High School International Department was established in 2008.

== Architecture ==
Fowler Biblical School chapel (汇文书院钟楼), which is located on the main campus, was constructed in 1888 and rebuilt in 1917. It was the first 3-storey building in Nanjing. In 2006 it was recognized as a Major Sites Protected at the National Level as part of the former site of University of Nanking.

== Culture ==
H. S. Thompson's "Annie Lisle", with lyrics written by Xiaoshi Hu, has been used as the official anthem of Jinling High School since the 1930s.

The school's motto is "Honesty, Truth, Diligence, Benevolence" (诚、真、勤、仁).

The school celebrates its anniversary on 2 October, a "Food Festival" (美食节) on 31 December and several Sports Days in October.

The school publishes several student-run campus magazines every quarter.

== Athletics ==
The boys' soccer team has been the national champion for many times as early as the 1930s. The girls' basketball team has recently triumphed at the Asian championship and the National championship.

== Notable alumni ==
- Li Yining, economist.
- Tian Gang, mathematician and leader of differential coefficient geometry.
- Gao Xingjian, Nobel Laureate in Literature.
- Qi Kang, member of the Chinese Academy of Sciences.
- Wu Zhonghua, physicist.
- Bao Zhenan, professor at Stanford University.

== Hexi campus ==
Jinling High School Hexi Campus (Chinese: 金陵中学河西分校) is a private high school affiliated with Jinling High School. It is located in the Hexi region in Jianye District, near Nanjing Olympic Sports Center.
