= Nanking Safety Zone =

Demilitarized area in Nanjing, China, 1937–1938

The Nanking Safety Zone

The Nanking Safety Zone (Chinese: 南京安全區; pinyin: Nánjīng Ānquán Qū; Japanese: 南京安全区, Nankin Anzenku, or 南京安全地帯, Nankin Anzenchitai) was a demilitarized zone for Chinese civilians set up on the eve of the Japanese breakthrough in the Battle of Nanking (December 13, 1937).

The Battle of Songhu was fought following the Marco Polo Bridge incident, during which the Japanese bombed Nanjing (Nanking) indiscriminately, resulting in the fatalities of a significant number of innocent civilians. In an effort to prevent additional casualties, Hang Liwu and a number of expatriates residing in Nanjing endeavored to establish a neutral zone within the city for refugees. Based on the Nanshi Refugee Zone (an initiative led by Jesuit Robert Jacquinot de Besange) in Shanghai, they designated a 3.86 square kilometer area in the western region of Nanjing city with the intention of leveraging the influence of foreigners to secure the area. The International Committee for the Safe Zone was formally established on November 22, with John Rabe as chairman, and committees for sanitation, lodging, and food were established to ensure the safe zone's normal operation. Additionally, letters were dispatched to Japan and China in an effort to secure recognition. Despite the fact that the Chinese accepted the delineation of the Safety Zone and transferred the actual jurisdiction of the territory to the committee, the Japanese have maintained an attitude that is somewhere between ambiguity and denial regarding the Safety Zone.

The Safety Zone was overwhelmed as a result of the continuous influx of refugees, which assumed responsibility for the municipal administration of certain areas of Nanjing following the National Government's withdrawal. While it did to a certain extent guarantee the basic necessities of life for the refugees within the Safety Zone, it did not entirely shield them from the Massacre. From December 14, 1937, the Japanese army disregarded the existence of the Safe Zone and, under the guise of searching for Chinese soldiers, embarked on a spree of burning, looting, and raping women within the boundaries of the Safe Zone. The Japanese army also burned and killed some of the refugees in shelters, which occurred in the aftermath of the fall of Nanjing. The International Committee for the Safe Zone lacked the necessary resources to prevent it from beginning to end. In February 1938, the Japanese army forcibly expelled the refugees from the zone on the grounds that the zone was impeding the operation of their puppet government. The International Committee for the Safe Zone was reorganized into the Nanking International Relief Committee on February 18, 1938, marking the conclusion of the safe zone. The refugee shelters within the safe zone ceased to operate entirely by June 1938.

== Background ==
Following the commencement of the Battle of Songhu on August 13, 1937, Japanese aircraft systematically and indiscriminately bombarded the city of Nanjing. In this context, the ambassadors of Germany, UK, France, Italy, and the United States contacted the U.S. Department of State on August 29, urging it to exert pressure on Japan to cease indiscriminate bombing. In response, the Japanese Counselor in the United States conveyed "deep regret" but contended that the bombing of Nanjing was justified due to the presence of numerous Chinese military strongholds both within and outside the city walls of Nanjing. Within and beyond the city walls, several Chinese military fortifications and regiments exist; nevertheless, the Japanese bombing campaigns also encompass civilian infrastructure, including residential districts, educational institutions, hospitals, commercial establishments, factories, transportation hubs, docks, and other facilities. The Japanese bombing resulted in a significant number of inhabitants becoming casualties, and on September 22, the Japanese army conducted an aerial assault on the Xiaguan Refugee Shelter (Chinese: 下关难民收容所) in Nanking, resulting in the immediate deaths of hundreds of refugees, despite repeated warnings from the U.S. side. On September 27, the League of Nations received a communication from Japan's foreign affairs administrator to the British, stating that there would be no further bombing of Nanking. The subsequent day, the League of Nations passed a resolution denouncing Japan's aerial assault on Nanking.

Following the fall of Shanghai on November 16, 1937, to mitigate the suffering of Nanjing's populace due to the war and to emulate the refugee zone established in southern Shanghai, the chairman of the board of trustees of Jinling University, Hang Liwu, proposed the creation of a safety zone in Nanjing. The subsequent day, W. P. Mills, Miner Searle Bates, and Lewis Smythe, professors at JLL, visited the private residence of Peck, a staff member of the U.S. Embassy in Nanjing, to deliberate the creation of a wartime safety zone in Nanjing to safeguard ordinary civilians following the withdrawal of the Chinese government. Minnie Vautrin, an instructor at the Ginling College, was designated to convey the proposal to the Japanese. In this conference, the men sought to assign the Chinese military control over the safe zone, so circumventing unwanted diplomatic entanglements for the West. That evening, Parker communicated the suggestion for a safe zone to Sun Fo and the Minister of Foreign Affairs of the National Government, Zhang Qun; however, Zhang Qun deemed it premature to present the plan at that moment. To effectively establish the safe zone, Hang Liwu, along with Bates and Mills, engaged in extensive communication with Chinese officials and prominent figures from Europe and America, securing the backing of ambassadors from multiple Western nations. Ultimately, Hang Liwu and approximately 20 individuals from the United States, Britain, Germany, and Denmark resolved to establish an international aid organization dedicated to the protection of refugees in Nanking, motivated by humanitarian principles, and designated it as the "International Committee for the Nanking Safety Zone".

== Establishment ==
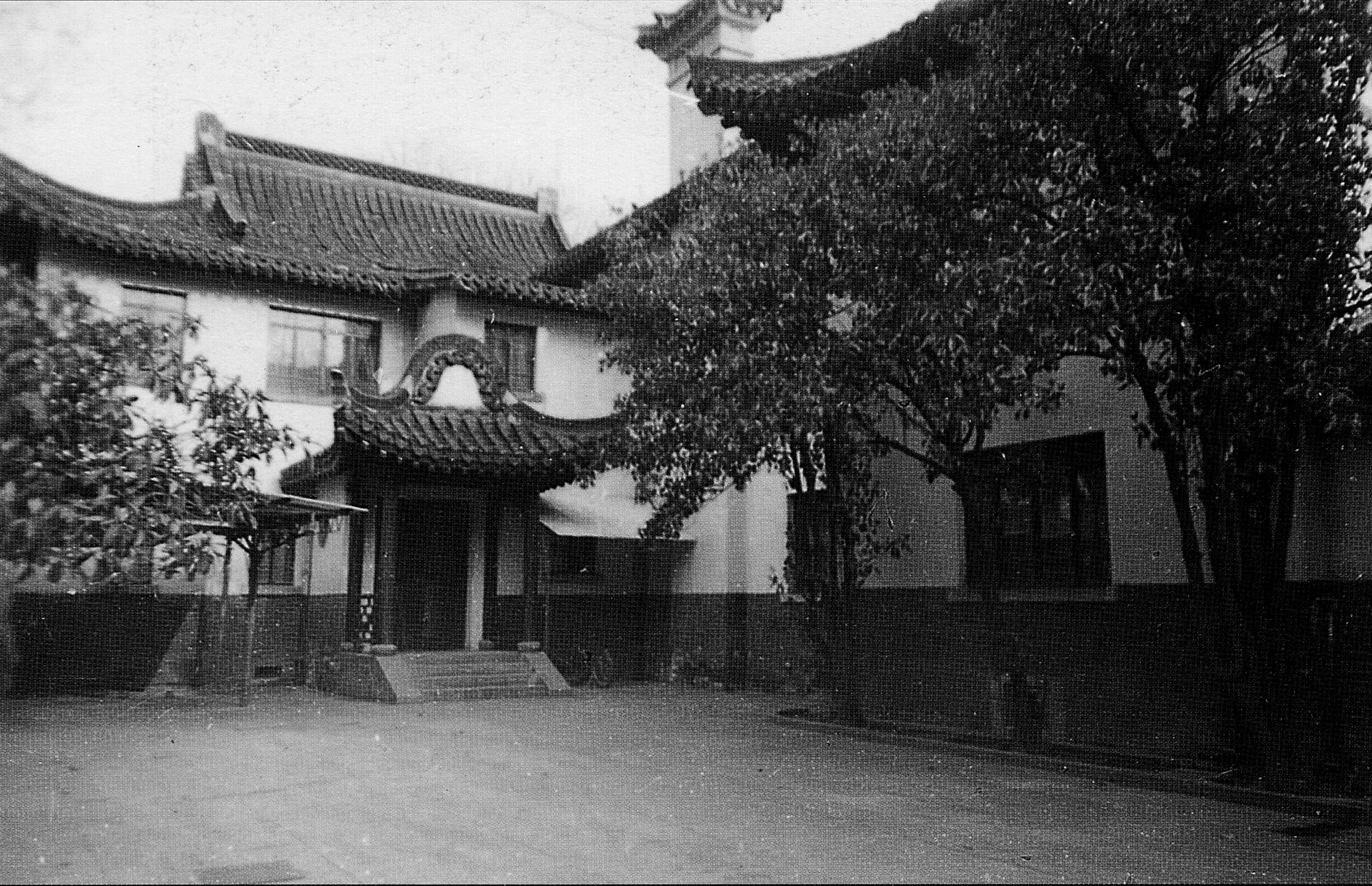
5 Ninghai Road was once the headquarters of the International Committee for the Nanking Safety Zone

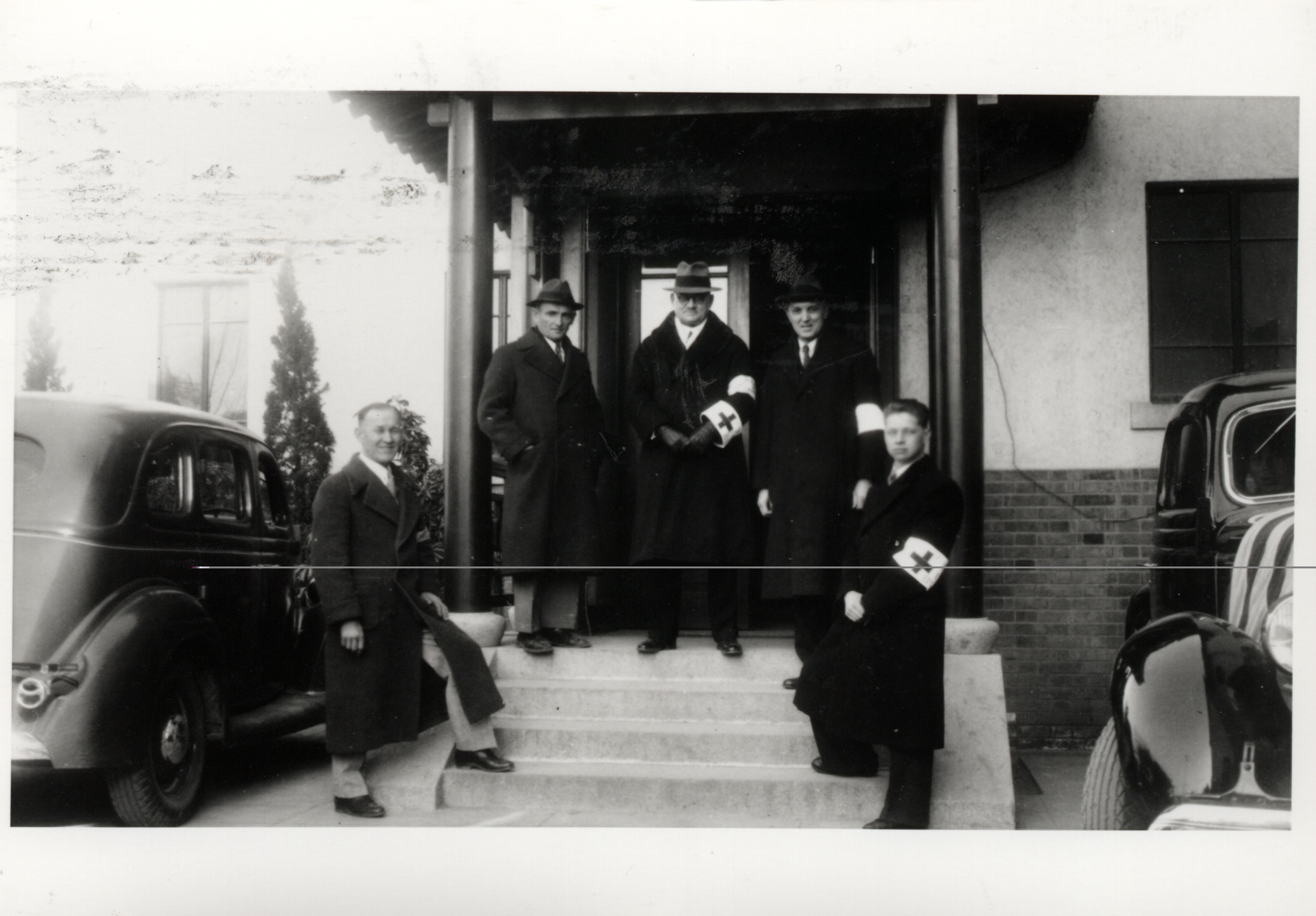
Some members of the International Committee for Nanking Safety Zone on Dec 13, 1937

On November 20, 1937, the Nationalist Government of Nanjing officially announced the relocation of the capital, prompting government officials to depart from Nanjing sequentially. On the afternoon of November 22, the International Committee for the Safe Zone convened, and John S.C. Rabe was appointed as the Chairman of the Committee. This signified the official creation of the Nanking Safety Zone and the International Committee of the Safety Zone.

On November 24, the International Committee of the Nanking Safety Zone transmitted a cable via the Japanese Ambassador to the U.S. Consul General in Shanghai, proposing the creation of a safety zone in Nanking to safeguard the refugees. The telegram underscored the obligation of the Safety Zone to secure specific assurances from the Chinese government, to dismantle all planned military installations, to refrain from deploying armed personnel beyond civilian police, and to forbid all military factions from entering the Safety Zone. On the November 25 and 29, the International Committee summoned the Japanese Ambassador and military authorities in Shanghai, anticipating their amicable acknowledgment of the Safety Zone. The Japanese official response was sluggish; however, the Japanese media, including the Nichi-Japan Shimbun, asserted that the creation of the Safety Zone impeded the Japanese assault on Nanking, while the Yomiuri Shimbun contended that the decision rested not with the Japanese government, but with the Japanese military.

On November 26, Chiang Kai-shek consented to the creation of the zone, and on November 29, the mayor of Nanjing, Ma Chaojun, publicly declared at a regular meeting of the Sino-British Cultural Association that the International Committee for the Nanjing Safe Zone had been officially constituted. Subsequently, Zhang Qun relocated to the German Embassy, which designated the International Committee as the office premises. On December 1, the jurisdiction of the safe zone was officially transferred from the Nanjing Municipal Government to the International Committee, accompanied by 10,000 sacks of flour, 20,000 sacks of rice, some salt, and 100,000 U.S. dollars in cash; however, due to transportation issues, these supplies had only arrived by December 7. 9,067 bags of rice, 1,000 bags of flour, 350 bags of salt, together with a total cash amount of 120,000 U.S. dollars before and after. Upon its inception, the safe zone was designed in the likeness of the Nanshi Refugee Zone in Shanghai, featuring a red cross within a black circle on a white backdrop as its insignia.

== Ranges ==
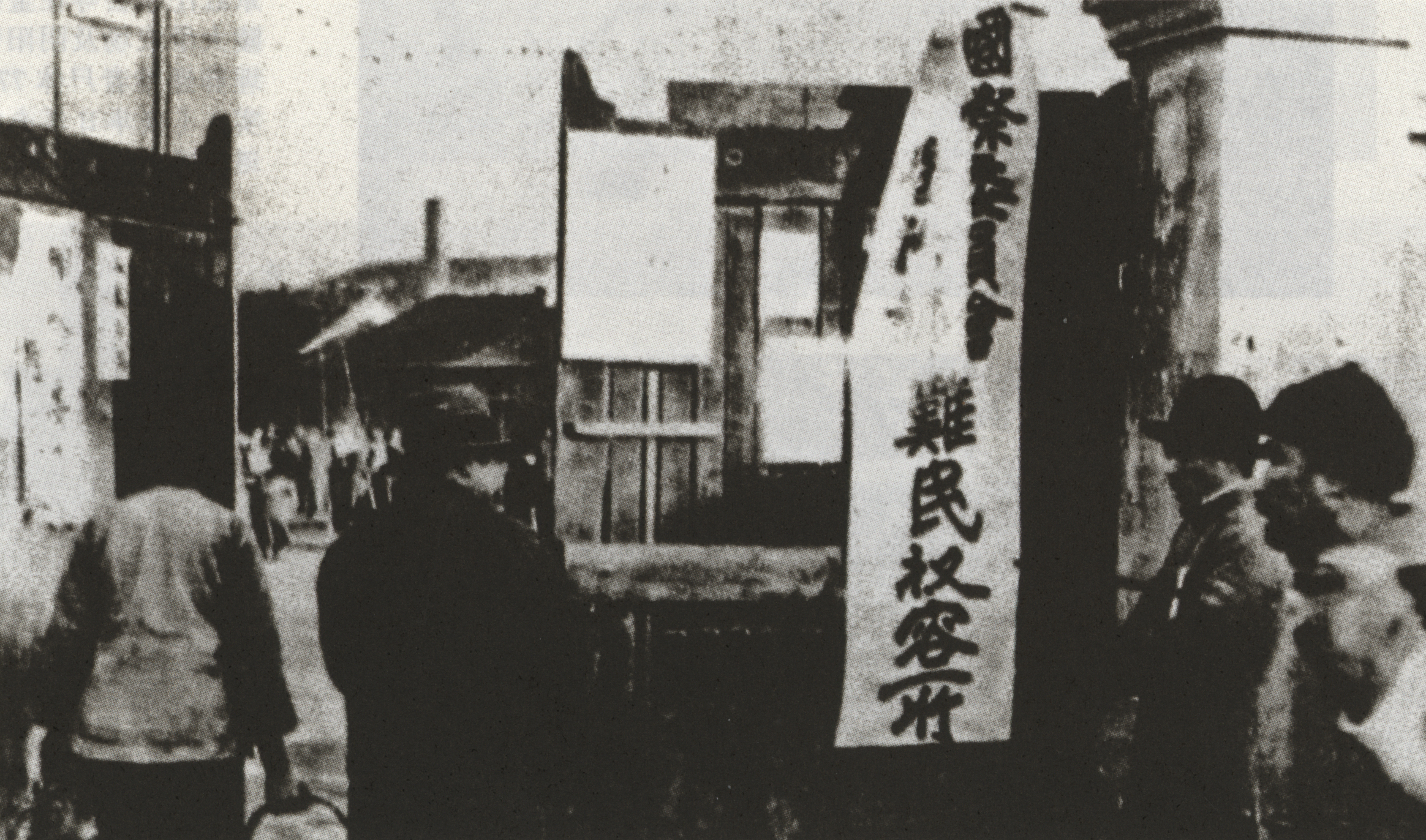
Refugee shelters established by the International Committee for the Nanking Safety Zone in 1937

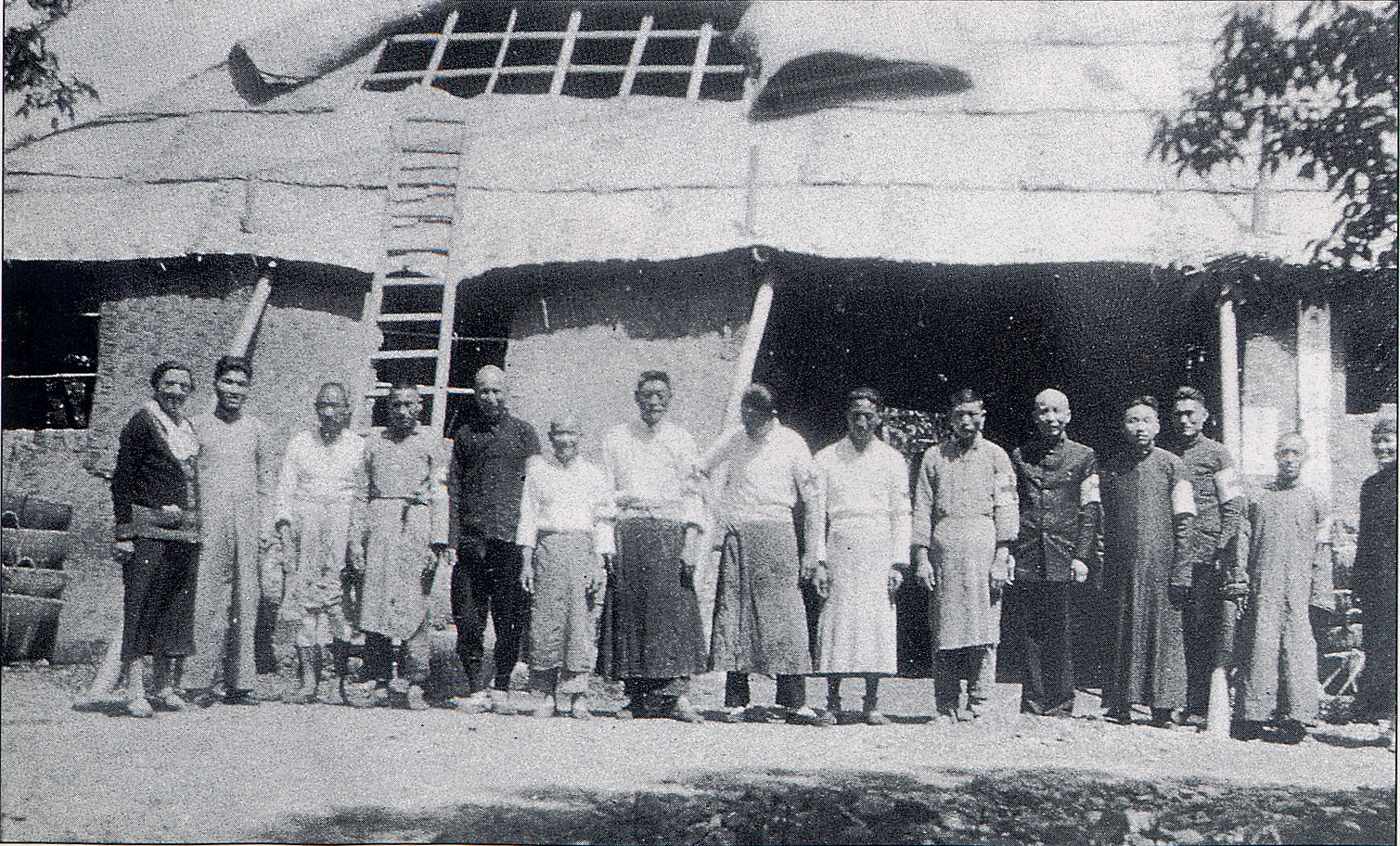
Porridge factories in a refugee shelter in 1937

The preliminary definition of the safety zone is as follows: to the east, from Xinjiekou at Zhongshan Road to the junction of Zhongshan Road and Zhongshan Road North, then northwest along Zhongshan Road North to the boundary of Shansi Road Plaza; to the north, from Shansi Road Plaza to Xikang Road; to the west, from the southern side of Xikang Road to the intersection of Han Road, then southeast to the line intersecting Shanghai Road and Hanzhong Road; and to the south, the segment of Hanzhong Road from the intersection of Shanghai Road to Xinjiekou, encompassing a total area of 3.86 square kilometers. The objective is to encompass colleges, universities, hospitals, and residential districts simultaneously, while circumventing the city's military installations. On December 8, to safeguard cultural treasures, Hang Liwu first planned to relocate the cultural artifacts from the Chaotian Palace and its vicinity into the security zone; however, this action was ultimately halted due to the notification of the security zone's boundaries to the Japanese authorities. The area is further from the Nanjing defense war zone, has a greater number of foreign embassies, and is hence less vulnerable to Japanese aerial bombardment. Furthermore, the "New Residential Area" was constructed in the 1920s and 1930s primarily for the Nationalist government to establish upscale villas for dignitaries. Following the fall of Shanghai, most residences in this area were vacated, along with numerous colleges and universities, including the Nanjing Union Theological Seminary and the Ginling College, which had the capacity to house a greater number of refugees.

As of December 17, the total refugee count in the safe zone was approximately 50,000, which rose to nearly 70,000 by the December 21. The total number of shelters in the Zone managed by the International Committee was 26. Minor inconsistencies exist in the literature, although the figure remains reasonably stable, as documented by authors including Wetterling, Fitch, and others, who have noted 25 shelters. Moreover, some shelters were established by the refugees themselves and several other organizations. The shelters lacked a cohesive management system, with some functioning as temporary refuges for refugees, devoid of a comprehensive leadership framework, and there was no standardized process for the establishment or dissolution of these shelters. The directors and assistants overseeing the numerous shelters are either esteemed citizens of the security zone or competent refugees with a degree of prestige. Their capacity to execute their responsibilities ranges from individuals committed to their tasks to those who extort refugees; yet, they generally manage to fulfill their roles. Directors and assistants are frequently replaced owing to incompetence and internal discord. The International Committee dispatched personnel to evaluate these shelters and provided inspection materials for future use.

Lists of Refugee Shelters Associated with the International Committee for Safe Zones
Name	Location	Director	Number of refugees	Management status	Notes
Army School	South of Gulou Hospital and West of Zhongshan Road within the Safety Zone	Zhao Chengkui	There were 3,500 refugees on December 17, 1937, and 3,200 remained by December 31	The International Committee for the Safe Zone (ICSZ) managed the camp, and on December 31, all refugees were divided into 27 groups, each with a leader; one-third of the refugees in the group took care of their own food, and the rest were supplied by the ICSZ. Ten bags of rice were distributed daily. The sanitary conditions still need to be improved, eating habits need to be adapted, and the overall situation is generally satisfactory.	Also known as the Army University, the Army College, and the Third Refugee Shelter
Hyogo	Huaqiao Road Compassionate Society in the Safety Zone	Lu Chengmei	There were 8,000 refugees on December 31, 1937, reaching 12,000 by January 22 the following year	The International Committee for the Safe Zone (ICSZ) administered the program. 3,000 received rice gruel without compensation, 2,400 took care of their own meals, and most of the refugees cooked for themselves. It was the most difficult shelter to manage because of unfair distribution, poor hygiene, and the need to improve organization and leadership.	Also known as the Armory and the Ministry of Transportation and Communications Old Building Refugee Shelter
German-Chinese Club	Unknown	Zhao Derong	There were 500 refugees on December 17, 1937, and 444 on December 31	The International Committee for the Safe Zone was administered. Two bags of rice were distributed daily, and they were relatively well provided for in terms of both housing and meals.	Also known as the German Club Refugee Shelter
Quaker Church Mission	Unknown	Hang Kung Sang	On January 1, 1938 there were 800 refugees.	Refugees organized themselves, with help and guardianship provided by the International Committee for the Safe Zone. Each family cooked their own food, but hygiene was a concern. They were often looted by the Japanese and the women were often raped by the Japanese.	The name of the director is phonetic
Hankou Road Elementary School	Hankow Road in the Safety Zone	Jung Dae-sung	1,400 refugees on January 1, 1938, up to 1,500 previously	Administered by the International Committee for the Safe Zone. Four bags of rice were allocated per day. The refugees in the facility were satisfied with the management, but the refugees were carrying more belongings, resulting in a slightly overcrowded and hygienic shelter.	The hygiene situation is a concern.
Jinling University High School	West side of Zhongshan Road in the Safety Zone	Jiang Zhengyun	11,000 refugees on January 3, 1938, up to 15,000 previously	The International Committee for the Safe Zone administered it. All refugees were registered and divided into 40 groups, in addition to an ambulance corps, an inspection team, and a fire department. The poor were allotted a total of 10 bags of rice per day and the rich were allowed to buy a total of 2 bags of rice per day, and there was a very clean central kitchen. It was well organized and led in a more orderly manner.	
55 Gaojia Tavern	West side of Zhongshan Road in the Safety Zone	Ling Yan Chung	770 refugees on January 3, 1938	The International Committee for the Safe Zone managed it. Refugees were divided into 2 groups and 1 bag of rice was distributed free of charge to 500 refugees per day. Leadership was fair, environment was crowded and hygiene could be improved.	
Military Chemical Plant	Dafang Lane in the Safety Zone	Wang Chengzai, Kong Pingliang	There were 4,000 refugees on December 17, and only 2,800 the following January 3	Administered by the International Committee for the Safe Zone. All refugees were registered. The shelter was specially protected by the Japanese army because refugees were often recruited as laborers by the Japanese army command. Six bags of rice were distributed daily and each person received about 12 ounces of rice per day with a ration card. It was managed in an orderly manner.	also known as Dafang Lane, Military Chemical Store Refugee Shelter
Shanxi Road Elementary School	North end of the safe zone	Wang Shoucheng	About 1,100 refugees on January 3, 1938, up to 1,500 previously	The International Committee for the Safe Zone managed it. Three bags of rice were distributed free of charge each day, and each family cooked their own food. The shelter was overcrowded and hygienic.	Security Zone International Committee
Overseas Chinese Club	West side of Zhongshan North Road in the Safety Zone	Mao Qing Ting	There were 2,500 refugees on December 17, 1937, and only 1,100 remained on January 3 of the following year	The International Committee for the Safe Zone administered it. The daily rice allotment was variable, almost all the refugees cooked inside the house, the houses were poorly lit, the sanitary conditions were poor, and the leadership was inadequate. on December 16, 1937, more than 5,000 refugees in the shelter were driven by the Japanese army to the riverside of Zhongshan Dock and were shot dead.	also known as Overseas Chinese Guest House Refugee Shelter
Judicial School	West side of Zhongshan Road in the Safety Zone	Tong Xiechen	There were 500 refugees on December 17, 1937, and 528 on January 4 of the following year, with a large number of foreign refugees from Shanghai and other places.	There were a large number of refugees from Shanghai and other places. Three bags of rice were distributed each day, and the vast majority received three bags of rice per day. About 30 people worked for the Japanese every day, so the shelter received special protection from the Japanese. Sanitary conditions were good and leadership was fair.	Also known as the Law School Refugee Shelter
Siemens Western Bank	No.1 Xiao Fan Qiao, now Rabe's former residence	Sheung Lin Han	On January 4, 1938, there were 602 refugees.	Managed by the International Committee for Safe Zones Mainly living in a straw hut in the courtyard, 3 bags of rice were distributed free of charge every day. The space was relatively small.	
The Sericulture Department, Jinling University	West of Gulou Sijie Lane and North of Jinyin Street in the Safety Zone	Wang Xinglong, Jin Zheqiao	There were 4,000 refugees on December 17, 1937, and only 3,304 on January 4 of the following year	The International Committee for the Safe Zone administered it. Refugees were required to purchase rice, which was distributed in quantities of 4-8 bags per day. Refugees generally complained of unfair distribution. Poor sanitary conditions and poor leadership.	Wang Xinglong was arrested by the Japanese on the grounds that he was "suspected of being a Chinese soldier", and was later represented by Kim Cheol Kyo. The latter's name is phonetic, his real name is unknown.
Agricultural School	North Guangzhou Road in the Safety Zone	Shen Jiayu	1,500 refugees on December 17, 1937, and 1,658 on January 4 of the following year	Administered by the International Committee for the Safe Zone There was an ambulance corps and a sub-committee of leaders. Distributed 2-3 bags of rice per day, double portions per day free of charge, single portions for adults twice as much as for children. Each family cooks their own food. Refugees are more satisfied and leadership is more adequate.	Also known as Agricultural Crops Department, Rural Teacher Training School Refugee Shelter
Bible Teacher Training School	Unknown	Kwok Chun Tak	3,400 refugees on January 4, 1938, 4,000 on January 16	The International Committee for Safe Zones administers. Living conditions were fair. However, the shelter was frequently looted and harassed by the Japanese, and 70% of the women had been raped by the Japanese. Five bags of rice were distributed every two days, which most refugees could afford to buy.	
Jinling Theological Seminary	North Hanzhong Road and East Shanghai Road in the Safety Zone	Tao Zhongliang	3,116 refugees on January 4, 1938	The International Committee for the Safe Zone administered it. Two bags of rice were distributed each day; elderly women and widows received it free of charge; others had to buy it with a ration card. Three-quarters of the refugees were not well off.	
Jinling University	Southwest of Gulou in the Safety Zone	Qi Zhaochang	7,000 refugees on January 5, 1938	The International Committee for the Safe Zone managed it. The congee factory was supplied with 25-30 bags of rice and 3 tons of coal per day. The porridge factory sold each cup of porridge for 3 coppers and sold it twice a day. The men return to the shelter every day to deliver food to the families. The distribution of rice was suspected to be unfair.	The shelter here refers specifically to the dormitory area of Jinling University.
Jinling University Library	Safety Zone Jinling University Campus	Leung Kai Chun	There were 3,000 refugees on January 5, 1938	The International Committee of the Safe Zone administered the shelter, but did not receive rice from the International Committee.Before January 1, 1938, porridge for the shelter was supplied by the porridge factory of Jinling University, but the supply was cut off later. There was opium smoking, gambling and robbery among the refugees, and the administration was chaotic.	The name of the director is phonetic
Ginling College	South of Hankow Road in the Safety Zone	Minnie Weitling	10,000 refugees in December 1937, about 5,000-6,000 on January 4, 1938, overwhelmingly women and children	The International Committee for the Safe Zone administered. Twelve bags of rice were distributed daily, with 350 refugees receiving free food, the rest at 3 coppers per cup of rice, and another 1,000 relying on their families to supply them with food. Excellent leadership.	
Wutai Mountain Elementary School	West Shanghai Road in the Safety Zone	Zhang Yili	1,640 refugees on January 5, 1938	The International Committee for the Safe Zone managed it, but only received porridge from the Red Swastika Society. The leadership was more effective.	The director's name is phonetic
Nanjing Language School	Small Peach Orchard, north of Guangzhou Road in the Safety Zone	Unknown	200 refugees on December 17, 1937	Administered by the International Committee for the Safe Zone, otherwise unknown.	Not known
Ministry of Justice	North Guangzhou Road and West Zhongshan Road in the Safety Zone	Unknown	1,000 refugees on December 14, 1937	Administered by the International Committee for the Safe Zone (ICSSZ). about 400-500 people were driven by the Japanese army and killed outside Hanzhong Gate on December 14, including more than 100 uniformed policemen and more than 300 volunteer policemen. The rest of the refugees were expelled by the Japanese on December 17, and the shelter has been vacant ever since.	
Supreme Court	South of Shansi Lu Square and West of Zhongshan Bei Lu in the Safety Zone	Unknown	Not available	Not known The International Committee for the Safe Zone (ICSZ) managed the shelter, which was vacated in December 1937 after a large number of refugees were killed in a Japanese raid and the remaining refugees were expelled on the 17th of the same month.	The shelter has been vacant since then.
Drum Tower West	Gulou Square West, Safety Zone	Li Ruiting	Unknown	Administered by the International Committee for the Safe Zone. between January 13 and 20, 1938, six Japanese soldiers raped seven women here.	Note: The area is located on the west side of Gulou Square in the Safety Zone.
Weiqingli (卫青里)	unknown, in a large mansion	unknown	Hundreds of refugees	Refugees organized themselves with the help and custody of the International Committee for Safe Zones (ICSZ).	The name of the place is phonetic
Shuangtang	Outside the Safety Zone, in the southwestern corner of Nanking, in the American Presbyterian Mission school, church and outbuildings.	Unknown	1,000 refugees on January 4, 1938, up to 2,000	Administered by the Presbyterian Church (U.S.A.), with the help and custody of the International Committee for the Safe Zone. Many of the refugees came to stay only for the night, two-thirds were able to feed themselves, and the rest were penniless. They were often looted by Japanese soldiers and the women were often raped.	also known as the American Presbyterian Mission, Church and Presbyterian Mission Refugee Shelter
Gulou Sijie Lane	Gulou Lane, in the Safety Zone.	Unknown	There were more than 50 refugees on December 16, 1937	On the day of December 16, all the refugees in the shelter were shot by the Japanese.	Not available
Taogu Xincun	former office of the 10th National Army in Nanjing, in the Safety Zone.	Unknown	There were still 200 refugees on December 12.	Unknown	Not known
Hutchison Bank	Shimonoseki Yangtze River	Unknown	7000 refugees	Hilts, a British businessman and member of the International Committee for the Safe Zone, supported its establishment. The International Committee for the Safe Zone had allocated 600 bags of rice to the Nanjing Branch of the Red Cross Society of China in early December 1937 for consumption in the Should Shelter and other shelters in its vicinity.	
Ge Tang (葛塘)	Getang Township, Liouhe County	Unknown	2000 refugees	The shelter had applied for relief to the International Committee for the Safe Zone, and on February 14, 1938, the International Committee stated in its situation report that it had received the application and agreed that the shelter needed to be relieved. The rest of the situation is unknown.	

== Governing Body ==
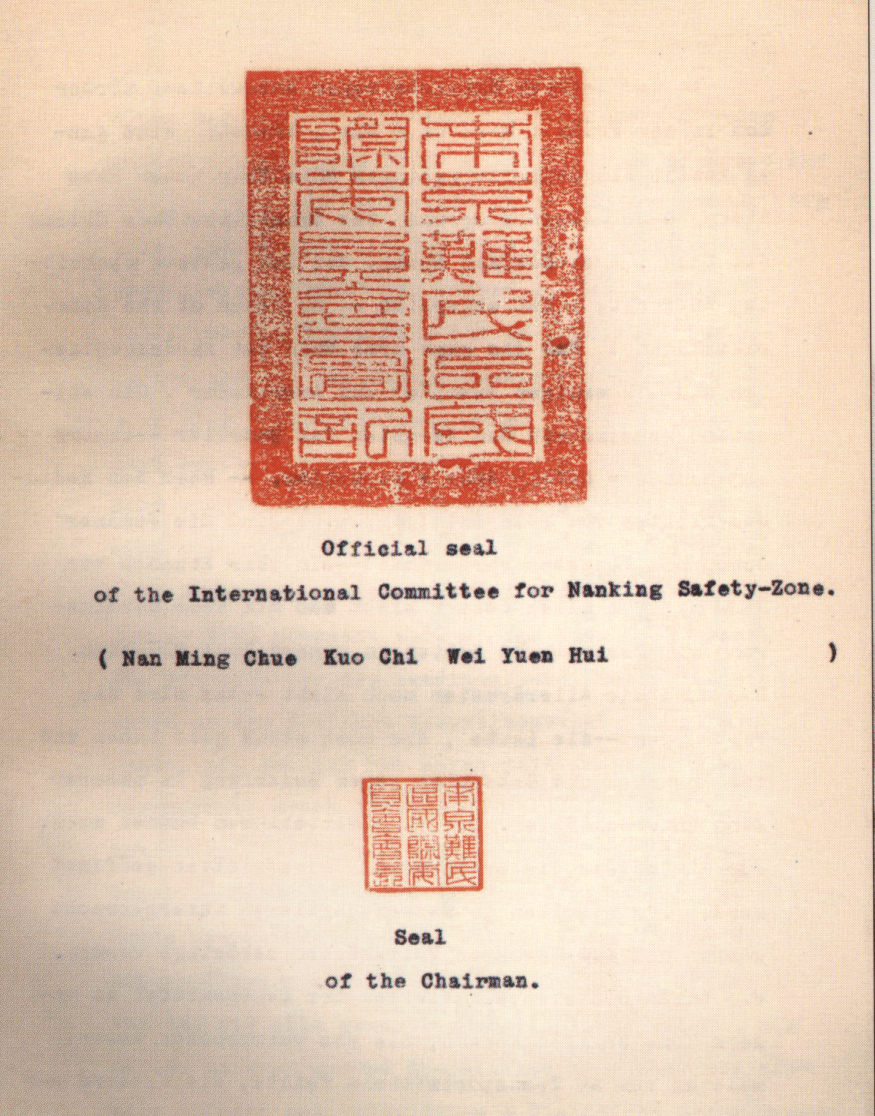
Seal of the International Committee for the Nanking Safety Zone

Upon the establishment of the International Committee for the Nanking Safety Zone, a secretariat was formed as a specialized entity to gather information from the involved parties, prepare pertinent reports, and facilitate communication with them. The principal entity of the International Committee was the Board of Directors, comprising John Rabe, Chairman; Lewis S. C. Smythe, Secretary; and the Englishmen P.H. Munro-Fanre of P.P. Shields, Ivor Mackay of Swire & Sons, and J. Lean of Asia Kerosene Company. (The four British members were part of the Committee at its inception but departed prior to the fall of Nanking on December 12, and they were also members of the International Committee.) American John Magee as an Anglican priest, served as the general inspector overseeing the operations of various sub-committees and the Refugee Shelter. Additionally, J.V. Pickering and J.V. Baker were associated with Mobil Oil Company; Bedes, Mills, C.S. Trimmer were physicians at Gulou Hospital); Charles Riggs was an expatriate educator at the University of Jinling; J.M. Hanson (Danish, Texas Kerosene Company); G. Schnltze-Pantin (German, Hing Ming Trading Company); Ednard Sperling of Shanghai Insurance Company. Additionally, present were George Fitcher, Deputy Director-General and Deputy Director of the Safety Zone, Hang Liwu, Deputy Director-General and Co-Director General representing the Chinese side (his appointment concluded on November 28, 1937; Hang Liwu traveled to Hankou with the Palace artifacts from the Chaotian Palace in early December and could not return to Nanjing until the subsequent dissolution of the Safety Zone), the director of the Chinese Secretariat, Tang Zhongmu, and staff member Chen Wenwen, among others. They were located at the Zhangqun Mansion in 5 Ninghai Road. Moreover, certain staff members were engaged on an ad hoc basis while safeguarding refugees in the Safety Zone, and some of these refugees provided testimonies regarding Japanese crimes.

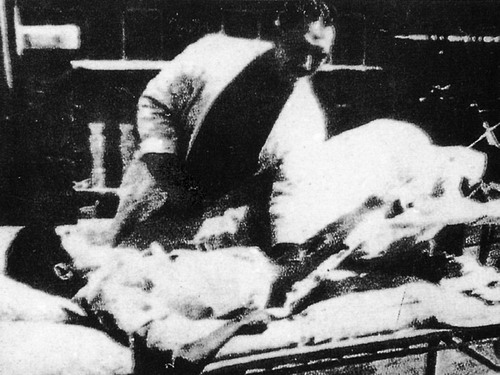
A 14-year-old Chinese child was shot by Japanese, and received medical treatment at Gulou Hospital

The International Committee was established with four subcommittees: the Food, Housing, Health, and Transport Committees. The Transportation Committee was integrated into the Food Committee shortly after its inception. The Housing Committee was the largest subcommittee, largely tasked with the allocation and upkeep of homes within the Safety Zone. The committee was led by Wang Ding, with Charles Riggs serving as deputy director, and comprised other members from China: Qi Zhaocang, Zhang Yongsheng, Zhu Shuchang, Wang Mingde, and Wang Youcheng. The committee partitioned the housing within the security zone into eight communities, with a new district to be created shortly thereafter. Each district maintained an office to address particular issues. The district heads, all of whom were Chinese, were: District 1, Wang Mingde; District 2, Jiang Zhengyun; District 3, Qi Zhaichang; District 4, Wang Xinglong (captured and killed by the Japanese army on December 28, 1937); District 5, Chen Feiran; District 6, Wu Guoging; District 7, Zhang Yongsheng; District 8, Jin Hanzhang; and District 9, Yang Guanpin.

The primary functions of the Food Committee were the delivery and distribution of food. The director was Han Xianglin, the deputy director was Hubert L. Thorne, and the members were Sun Yaosan, Zhu Jing, Cai Chaosong, Chao Laowu, Xiao, Meng, and Tao Xisan from the Red Swastika Society. The impoverished refugees in the shelter received rice and food at no cost, whilst those who could afford it were required to pay a little fee. The shelter's food supply was consequently maintained at a minimum level.

The responsibilities of the Sanitation Committee included ensuring the cleanliness of the shelters and restrooms, addressing the health issues of the refugees within the shelters, and subsequently sanitizing the water sources and streets where bodies were present. Shen Yushu was the chairperson of the committee, while Dr. Drimmer from the Gulou Hospital held the position of vice-chairperson. The committee's sanitation personnel were originally designated as 400; however, following the Japanese invasion of Nanjing, several workers were indiscriminately executed. On December 15, 1937, six workers were shot in the street by Japanese soldiers, and another sustained severe injuries, resulting in the neglect of sanitation outside the refugee shelter. Special sanitation officers were assigned to each neighborhood of the Housing Committee.

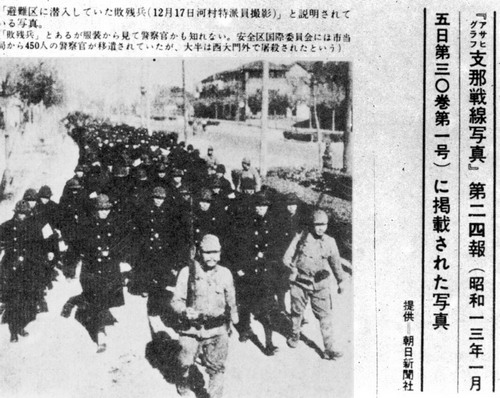
On December 17, 1937, Chinese policemen were targeted and captured by the Japanese Army in Nanking Safety Zone

Magee and associates founded the Nanking Chapter of the International Red Cross at the headquarters of the International Committee, appointing Magee as president, Li Junan and Walter Lowe as vice-presidents, Ernest Foster as secretary-general, and including Christian Kroeger as treasurer, along with Mrs. Paul Dewitt Twinem, Minnie Weitling, Robert Wilson, Fowler, Drimmer, James Mcgallun, Bedes, John Rabe, Lewis Smythe, Mills, Cola Podshivoloff, and Shen Yushu. The chapter submitted letters to the International Red Cross in Shanghai and the Red Cross in China for acknowledgment. The chapter undertook responsibilities for treating injured soldiers and refugees, ensuring sanitary conditions, and offering assistance to refugees within the Safety Zone. The Nanjing Branch of the World Red Swastika Society managed the distribution of food and clothing, as well as the collection of corpses within the Safety Zone; however, Japanese forces appropriated the Society's trucks, along with the coffins and personnel designated for corpse collection.

During the initial phase of the zone's establishment, the Nanjing city government sent 450 uniformed police personnel to uphold law and order within the area. A voluntary police force composed of immigrants and local citizens existed, typically donning merely armbands instead of uniforms. On December 17, 1937, 50 uniformed policemen and 45 volunteer policemen were specifically targeted and captured by the Japanese Army. The subsequent day, an additional 40 uniformed police were apprehended by the Japanese. The Japanese appropriated firefighting resources from the city of Nanking, resulting in uncontrollable fires erupting in all directions within and outside the security zone.

== Termination ==
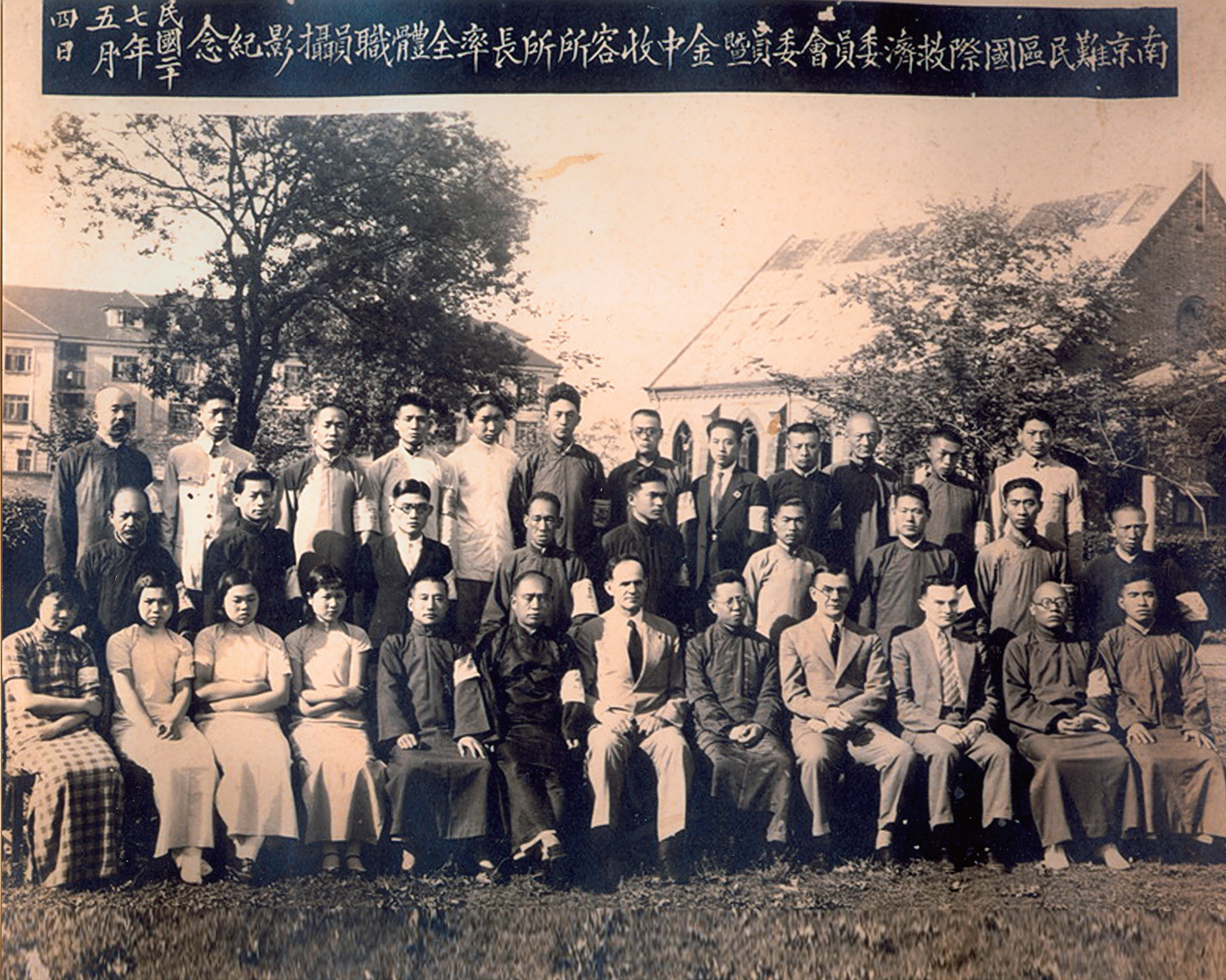
Nanking International Relief Committee in April 1938

As a significant influx of refugees sought asylum in the Safety Zone, the puppet regime imposed by the Japanese army became nearly defunct. Concurrently, the International Committee for the Safety Zone's promotion of Western values considerably obstructed the Japanese army's enslavement policies. Consequently, the Japanese secret service dispatched an official responsible for the Safety Zone, along with a representative from the so-called Nanking Autonomous Committee, to inform the leaders of the refugee shelters of the mandate for the evacuation of all refugees on January 28, 1938. Two days later, the Japanese authorities insisted that all refugees return to their former residences by February 4, threatening to forcibly evict them from the shelters if they failed to comply, while simultaneously prohibiting any commercial activities within the safety zone. Under duress, the refugees departed the Zone individually, resulting in a gradual diminishment of its importance. Fifty percent of the Chinese personnel in the Safety Zone chose to leave Nanjing following a slight improvement in conditions, since their families had already relocated to safer areas, resulting in a progressive insufficiency of manpower in the Safety Zone.

John Rabe and his International Committee were credited with saving 200,000–250,000 lives despite the ongoing massacre. After George Ashmore Fitch departed, Hubert Lafayette Sone was elected Administrative Director of the Nanking International Relief Committee. On February 18, 1938, the International Committee of the Safety Zone was compelled to restructure as the International Relief Committee of Nanjing. This decision was communicated to the U.S., British, and German embassies in China. Subsequently, the management of the Safety Zone was progressively assumed by the puppet institutions established by the Japanese army, thereby officially concluding the Safety Zone, with the final refugee shelters closing in June of that year. By late 1939 and early 1940, the operations of the Relief Committee were essentially concluded, and in August 1940, the Nanking International Relief Committee was formally disbanded.

== Legacy ==
On February 23, 1938, Rabe departed from Nanjing to return to Germany. During this journey, he revealed all of his and Fitch's diaries regarding the Nanking Massacre, which were subsequently compiled and published by Harold John Timperley and Hsu Shu-hsi. Following the investigation, a substantial quantity of archival data regarding Chinese personnel was lost, and many eyewitnesses did not document their accounts during their lifetimes, leading to an inability to verify the identities and specific actions of numerous Chinese staff members.

As of 2018, nine immovable cultural relics associated with the Nanjing Safety Zone exist, situated at the Suiyuan Campus of Nanjing Normal University (formerly a refugee shelter for the Ginling College), the Gulou Campus of Nanjing University (formerly a refugee shelter for Jinling University), Rabe's Old Residence (formerly a refugee shelter for the Siemens Foreign Bank), Hankou Road Elementary School, the Jiangsu Deliberation Garden (formerly the Overseas Chinese Club), Jinling High School (formerly Jinling University High School and its refugee shelter), 140 Hanzhong Road (formerly the Jinling Theological Seminary Refugee Shelter), the entrance of the former Ministry of Justice of the National Government, and 101 Zhongshan North Road (formerly the Supreme Court of the National Government). Not all areas are designated with signage regarding the Nanjing Safety Zone, and the degree of protection for cultural artifacts varies slightly.

== See also ==
- George Ashmore Fitch
- Minnie Vautrin
- Shanghai Ghetto
- Nanking (1937－1945)

== Sources ==
- Rabe, John, The Good Man of Nanking: The Diaries of John Rabe, Vintage (Paper), 2000. ISBN 0-375-70197-4
- Vautrin, Wilhemina, Minnie Vautrin Papers. Special Collection, Yale Divinity School Library, Record Group No. 8 and No. 11.
