= Shanghai Gezhi High School =

School in Shanghai, China

Shanghai Gezhi High School (Chinese: 上海市格致中学), also referred to as Gezhi, is a comprehensive three-year public high school. Its main campus is located in the People's Square area in Huangpu District, Shanghai. Previously known as the Gezhi Academy, was founded by chemist Xu Shou, mathematician Hua Hengfang, and British missionary John Fryer in 1874.
